As of September 2016, the International Union for Conservation of Nature (IUCN) lists 5430 Vulnerable (VU) plant species. 25% of all evaluated plant species are listed as Vulnerable. 
The IUCN also lists 244 subspecies and 235 varieties as Vulnerable. No subpopulations of plants have been evaluated by the IUCN.

For a species to be assessed as vulnerable to extinction the best available evidence must meet quantitative criteria set by the IUCN designed to reflect "a high risk of extinction in the wild". Endangered and Critically Endangered species also meet the quantitative criteria of Vulnerable species, and are listed separately. See: List of endangered plants, List of critically endangered plants. Vulnerable, Endangered, and Critically Endangered species are collectively referred to as threatened species by the IUCN.

Additionally 1674 plant species (7.6% of those evaluated) are listed as Data Deficient, meaning there is insufficient information for a full assessment of conservation status. As these species typically have small distributions and/or populations, they are intrinsically likely to be threatened, according to the IUCN. While the category of Data Deficient indicates that no assessment of extinction risk has been made for the taxa, the IUCN notes that it may be appropriate to give them "the same degree of attention as threatened taxa, at least until their status can be assessed."

This is a complete list of Vulnerable plant species, subspecies and varieties evaluated by the IUCN .

Algae

Acrosorium papenfussii
Austrofolium equatorianum
Pseudolaingia hancockii

Bryophytes
There are 24 bryophyte species assessed as vulnerable.

Mosses

Ambuchanania leucobryoides
Aschisma kansanum
Donrichardsia macroneuron
Echinodium renauldii
Echinodium setigerum
Gradsteinia torrenticola
Hypnodontopsis apiculata
Leucoperichaetium eremophilum
Sphagnum novo-caledoniae
Takakia ceratophylla

Liverworts

Calypogeia rhynchophylla
Fulfordianthus evansii
Haesselia roraimensis
Hattoria yakushimensis
Jamesoniella undulifolia
Myriocoleopsis fluviatilis
Nardia huerlimannii
Nowellia wrightii
Perssoniella vitreocincta
Radula jonesii
Riccia alatospora
Riccia atlantica
Scaphophyllum speciosum
Sewardiella tuberifera

Pteridophytes
There are 83 species and one subspecies of pteridophyte assessed as vulnerable.

Leptosporangiate ferns
There are 69 species in the class Polypodiopsida assessed as vulnerable.

Polypodiales
There are 61 species in the order Polypodiales assessed as vulnerable.

Dryopteridaceae

Bolbitis riparia
Cyrtomium nephrolepioides
Dryopteris liliana, Buckler fern
Elaphoglossum antisanae
Elaphoglossum bryogenes
Elaphoglossum ecuadorense
Elaphoglossum heliconiaefolium
Elaphoglossum hieronymi
Elaphoglossum inciens
Elaphoglossum molle
Elaphoglossum muriculatum
Elaphoglossum oleandropsis
Elaphoglossum yatesii
Polybotrya andina
Polystichum bonapartii

Polypodiaceae

Campyloneurum oellgaardii
Ceradenia melanopus
Ceradenia semiadnata
Grammitis pervillei
Grammitis sechellarum
Lellingeria paucipinnata
Lellingeria strangeana
Leptochilus cantoniensis
Micropolypodium aphelolepis
Polypodium latissimum
Polypodium quitense

Athyriaceae

Diplazium chimboanum
Diplazium divisissimum
Diplazium leptogrammoides
Diplazium mildei
Diplazium navarretei
Diplazium oellgaardii
Diplazium palaviense
Diplazium rivale

Thelypteridaceae

Cyclosorus sino-acuminata
Thelypteris aculeata
Thelypteris appressa
Thelypteris campii
Thelypteris chimboracensis
Thelypteris conformis
Thelypteris correllii
Thelypteris dodsonii
Thelypteris elegantula
Thelypteris euthythrix
Thelypteris rosenstockii
Thelypteris subtilis

Other Polypodiales species

Aleuritopteris albofusca
Asplenium ascensionis
Asplenium compressum, Plastic fern
Asplenium hermannii-christii, Asplenium of Hermann christ
Asplenium schweinfurthii
Cleistoblechnum eburneum (syn. Blechnum eburneum)
Dennstaedtia macrosora
Dennstaedtia paucirrhiza
Dennstaedtia tryoniana
Hecistopteris pinnatifida
Pteris albersii
Pteris incompleta, Laurisilva brake
Woodsia indusiosa

Hymenophyllales
Hymenophyllum alveolatum
Trichomanes paucisorum

Cyatheales

Cyathea bipinnata
Cyathea halonata
Cyathea hemiepiphytica
Cyathea punctata
Dicksonia arborescens, St Helena tree fern

Salviniales
Marsilea schelpeana

Isoetopsida

Isoetes azorica, Azorean quillwort
Isoetes ecuadoriensis
Isoetes herzogii
Isoetes parvula
Isoetes saracochensis

Lycopodiopsida

Species

Huperzia ascendens
Huperzia austroecuadorica
Huperzia columnaris
Huperzia compacta
Huperzia espinosana
Huperzia llanganatensis
Huperzia scabrida
Huperzia talpiphila
Selaginella carinata

Subspecies
Huperzia dacrydioides subsp. dura

Gymnosperms
There are 156 species, seven subspecies, and 34 varieties of gymnosperm assessed as vulnerable.

Cycads

Species

Ceratozamia mexicana
Ceratozamia microstrobila
Ceratozamia vovidesii
Cycas aculeata
Cycas armstrongii
Cycas bifida
Cycas cairnsiana
Cycas collina
Cycas condaoensis
Cycas cupida
Cycas desolata
Cycas diannanensis
Cycas falcata
Cycas guizhouensis
Cycas inermis
Cycas macrocarpa
Cycas megacarpa
Cycas micholitzii
Cycas nathorstii
Cycas nongnoochiae
Cycas ophiolitica
Cycas panzhihuaensis
Cycas pectinata
Cycas pranburiensis
Cycas saxatilis
Cycas seemannii
Cycas segmentifida
Cycas semota
Cycas shanyaensis
Cycas siamensis
Cycas silvestris
Cycas tuckeri
Cycas zeylanica
Dioon angustifolium
Dioon argenteum
Dioon merolae
Dioon purpusii
Dioon tomasellii
Encephalartos altensteinii, Eastern cape cycad
Encephalartos aplanatus
Encephalartos barteri
Encephalartos ghellinckii, Drakensberg cycad
Encephalartos gratus, Mulanje cycad
Encephalartos humilis, Dwarf cycad
Encephalartos manikensis, Gorongo cycad
Encephalartos marunguensis, Marungu cycad
Encephalartos ngoyanus, Ngoye cycad
Encephalartos paucidentatus, Barberton cycad
Encephalartos princeps, Kei cycad
Encephalartos schaijesii
Encephalartos schmitzii, Schmitz's cycad
Encephalartos senticosus, Jozini cycad
Encephalartos trispinosus, Bushman's river cycad
Macrozamia cardiacensis
Macrozamia conferta
Macrozamia crassifolia
Macrozamia humilis
Macrozamia machinii
Macrozamia occidua
Macrozamia parcifolia
Macrozamia platyrhachis
Macrozamia secunda
Stangeria eriopus, Natal grass cycad
Zamia acuminata
Zamia angustifolia
Zamia cunaria
Zamia encephalartoides
Zamia erosa
Zamia herrerae
Zamia neurophyllidia
Zamia oreillyi
Zamia soconuscensis
Zamia standleyi
Zamia stricta

Subspecies
Encephalartos barteri subsp. barteri, West African cycad

Conifers

Species

Abies fabri, Faber's fir
Abies hidalgensis
Abies recurvata, Min fir
Abies squamata, Flaky fir
Afrocarpus mannii
Agathis dammara, Amboina pitch tree
Agathis flavescens, Tahan agathis
Agathis lanceolata, Koghis kauri
Agathis lenticula
Agathis moorei, Moore's kauri
Amentotaxus formosana, Taiwan catkin yew
Amentotaxus poilanei, Poilane's catkin yew
Amentotaxus yunnanensis, Yunnan catkin yew
Araucaria bernieri
Araucaria biramulata
Araucaria heterophylla, Norfolk Island pine
Araucaria montana
Araucaria schmidii
Athrotaxis cupressoides, Pencil pine
Athrotaxis selaginoides, King William pine
Callitris monticola, Steelhead
Callitris oblonga, Tasmanian cypress-pine
Cathaya argyrophylla
Cedrus libani, Cedar of Lebanon
Cephalotaxus mannii, Mann's yew plum
Cephalotaxus oliveri, Oliver's plum yew
Cupressus bakeri, Baker cypress
Cupressus chengiana, Cheng cypress
Cupressus macrocarpa, Monterey cypress
Cupressus sargentii, Sargent cypress
Dacrydium leptophyllum
Dacrydium medium
Fokienia hodginsii, Fujian cypress
Juniperus angosturana
Juniperus barbadensis, West Indies juniper
Juniperus brevifolia, Azores juniper
Juniperus tibetica, Tibetan juniper
Keteleeria evelyniana
Nageia motleyi
Parasitaxus usta
Picea asperata, Dragon spruce
Picea brachytyla, Sargent's spruce
Picea breweriana, Brewer's spruce
Picea farreri, Farrer's spruce
Picea likiangensis, Likiang spruce
Picea morrisonicola, Mount Morrison spruce
Picea torano, Tigertail spruce
Pilgerodendron uviferum, Guaitecas cypress
Pinus greggii, Gregg's pine
Pinus krempfii, Krempf's pine
Pinus merkusii, Merkus's pine
Pinus muricata, Bishop pine
Pinus rzedowskii, Rzedowski's pine
Pinus tecunumanii, Schwerdtfeger's pine
Pinus tropicalis, Tropical pine
Podocarpus angustifolius
Podocarpus archboldii
Podocarpus fasciculus
Podocarpus gibbsiae
Podocarpus lophatus
Podocarpus matudae
Podocarpus pallidus
Podocarpus polystachyus
Podocarpus ridleyi
Podocarpus rusbyi
Podocarpus salignus, Willow-leaf podocarp
Prumnopitys andina
Prumnopitys ladei, Mt Spurgeon black pine
Prumnopitys montana
Pseudolarix amabilis, Chinese golden larch
Pseudotaxus chienii, Whiteberry yew
Pseudotsuga sinensis, Chinese Douglas-fir
Retrophyllum rospigliosii
Taiwania cryptomerioides, Coffin tree
Taxus mairei, Maire's yew
Thuja koraiensis, Korean arbor-vitae
Torreya californica, California nutmeg
Torreya fargesii, Farges nutmeg tree
Tsuga forrestii, Forrest's hemlock

Subspecies

Abies cilicica subsp. isaurica
Abies fabri subsp. fabri
Abies fabri subsp. minensis, Minshan fir
Agathis robusta subsp. nesophila
Pinus cembroides subsp. lagunae
Pinus torreyana subsp. insularis, Santa rosa Island pine

Varieties

Abies durangensis var. coahuilensis
Abies fargesii var. faxoniana
Abies recurvata var. ernestii
Abies recurvata var. recurvata
Abies veitchii var. sikokiana, Shikoku fir
Abies vejarii var. macrocarpa
Abies vejarii var. mexicana
Abies vejarii var. vejarii
Cedrus libani var. brevifolia
Cedrus libani var. libani
Chamaecyparis obtusa var. formosana
Cupressus chengiana var. chengiana
Cupressus torulosa var. gigantea
Juniperus barbadensis var. lucayana, Bahaman juniper
Juniperus blancoi var. blancoi
Juniperus blancoi var. huehuentensis
Juniperus blancoi var. mucronata
Juniperus deppeana var. robusta
Juniperus flaccida var. martinezii
Juniperus pingii var. pingii
Larix potaninii var. chinensis
Picea asperata var. asperata
Picea brachytyla var. brachytyla
Picea brachytyla var. complanata
Picea likiangensis var. likiangensis
Picea likiangensis var. rubescens
Pinus arizonica var. cooperi
Pinus arizonica var. stormiae
Pinus armandii var. dabeshanensis
Pinus brutia var. pityusa, Pitsundian pine
Pinus caribaea var. bahamensis, Bahamas pine
Pinus radiata var. binata
Pseudotsuga sinensis var. brevifolia
Pseudotsuga sinensis var. sinensis

Gnetopsida

Gnetum acutum
Gnetum contractum
Gnetum globosum

Dicotyledons
There are 4545 species, 230 subspecies, and 197 varieties of dicotyledon assessed as vulnerable.

Piperales
There are 24 species in the order Piperales assessed as vulnerable.

Piperaceae

Peperomia choritana
Peperomia crispa
Peperomia graveolens
Peperomia inconspicua
Peperomia millei
Peperomia persulcata
Peperomia porphyridea
Peperomia rupicola
Peperomia scutellariifolia
Peperomia simplex
Peperomia thienii
Piper hylebates
Piper hylophilum
Piper lineatipilosum
Piper napo-pastazanum
Piper nebuligaudens
Piper pedicellatum
Piper schuppii
Piper seychellarum, Seychelles pepper
Piper sodiroi
Piper subaduncum
Piper supernum

Chloranthaceae
Hedyosmum mexicanum
Hedyosmum purpurascens

Campanulales
There are 51 species and two subspecies in Campanulales assessed as vulnerable.

Campanulaceae

Species

Adenophora taquetii
Asyneuma giganteum
Burmeistera brachyandra
Burmeistera crispiloba
Burmeistera cylindrocarpa
Burmeistera loejtnantii
Burmeistera oblongifolia
Burmeistera racemiflora
Burmeistera truncata
Campanula dzyschrica, Dzyshrian campanula
Campanula engurensis, Engurian bellflower
Campanula fonderwisii
Campanula kolakovskyi, Kolakovskiy's bellflower
Campanula mairei
Campanula pontica, Pontic campanula
Campanula sabatia
Campanula suanetica, Svanetian bellflower
Centropogon arcuatus
Centropogon baezanus
Centropogon eurystomus
Centropogon fimbriatulus
Centropogon jeppesenii
Centropogon licayensis
Centropogon papillosus
Centropogon quebradanus
Centropogon rubrodentatus
Centropogon saltuum
Centropogon trachyanthus
Centropogon trichodes
Clermontia hawaiiensis, Hawaii clermontia
Clermontia oblongifolia
Cyanea aculeatiflora, Prickly-flower cyanea
Cyanea fauriei
Cyanea habenata
Cyanea hardyi
Cyanea leptostegia, Giant koke'e cyanea
Cyanea solenocalyx, Molokai cyanea
Cyanea tritomantha
Lobelia columnaris
Lobelia gilletii
Lobelia hereroensis
Lysipomia acaulis
Lysipomia caespitosa
Lysipomia oellgaardii
Siphocampylus affinis
Siphocampylus humboldtianus
Trimeris scaevolifolia, St Helena lobelia
Wahlenbergia angustifolia, Small bellflower

Subspecies
Clermontia oblongifolia subsp. oblongifolia
Wahlenbergia ramosissima subsp. ramosissima

Goodeniaceae

Scaevola chanii
Scaevola muluensis
Scaevola verticillata

Aristolochiales

Aristolochia cucurbitifolia
Aristolochia cucurbitoides
Aristolochia hainanensis
Aristolochia obliqua
Aristolochia thwaitesii
Aristolochia yunnanensis
Asarum crispulatum
Asarum fudsinoi
Asarum maximum
Asarum simile
Pararistolochia ceropegioides
Pararistolochia goldieana

Theales
There are 197 species, three subspecies, and nine varieties in Theales assessed as vulnerable.

Dipterocarpaceae

Species

Cotylelobium lanceolatum
Dipterocarpus retusus
Hopea exalata
Hopea foxworthyi
Hopea griffithii
Hopea odorata
Hopea pachycarpa
Hopea pterygota
Neobalanocarpus heimii
Shorea alutacea
Shorea macrophylla
Shorea uliginosa

Subspecies

Dipterocarpus conformis subsp. borneensis
Vatica oblongifolia subsp. oblongifolia
Vatica oblongifolia subsp. selakoensis

Ochnaceae

Species

Campylospermum letouzeyi
Campylospermum scheffleri
Fleurydora felicis
Lophira alata, Azobe
Ouratea amplectens
Ouratea cocleensis
Ouratea quintasii
Ouratea schusteri
Ouratea tumacoensis
Sauvagesia brevipetala

Varieties
Campylospermum vogelii var. molleri

Theaceae

Species

Adinandra corneriana
Apterosperma oblata
Balthasaria mannii
Camellia chrysantha
Camellia crapnelliana, Crapnell's camellia
Camellia euphlebia
Camellia flavida
Camellia fleuryi
Camellia formosensis
Camellia gilbertii
Camellia granthamiana, Grantham's camellia
Camellia mileensis
Camellia pleurocarpa
Camellia pubipetala
Camellia renshanxiangiae
Camellia reticulata
Camellia stuartiana
Camellia szemaoensis
Camellia transarisanensis
Camellia trichoclada
Cleyera bolleana
Cleyera vaccinioides
Eurya sandwicensis
Freziera alata
Freziera angulosa
Freziera biserrata
Freziera caesariata
Freziera caloneura
Freziera campanulata
Freziera ciliata
Freziera cordata
Freziera echinata
Freziera ferruginea
Freziera glabrescens
Freziera incana
Freziera jaramilloi
Freziera minima
Freziera obovata
Freziera parva
Freziera punctata
Freziera retinveria
Freziera rufescens
Freziera sessiliflora
Freziera suberosa
Freziera uncinata
Freziera velutina
Gordonia penangensis
Gordonia singaporeana
Polyspora hirtella
Polyspora maingayi
Polyspora multinervis
Polyspora scortechinii
Polyspora taipingensis
Ternstroemia corneri
Ternstroemia howardiana
Ternstroemia penangiana
Ternstroemia polypetala
Ternstroemia wallichiana

Varieties

Anneslea fragrans var. lanceolata
Camellia indochinensis var. tunghinensis
Pyrenaria serrata var. kunstleri
Schima wallichii var. pulgarensis

Actinidiaceae

Actinidia chrysantha
Actinidia laevissima
Actinidia pilosula
Actinidia rudis
Actinidia suberifolia
Actinidia ulmifolia
Actinidia vitifolia
Saurauia bracteosa
Saurauia cauliflora
Saurauia erythrocarpa
Saurauia harlingii
Saurauia lanceolata
Saurauia latipetala
Saurauia leucocarpa
Saurauia microphylla
Saurauia oreophila
Saurauia rubrisepala
Saurauia villosa

Guttiferae

Species

Allanblackia gabonensis
Allanblackia stuhlmannii
Allanblackia ulugurensis
Bonnetia bolivarensis
Bonnetia celiae
Bonnetia chimantensis
Bonnetia cordifolia
Bonnetia holostyla
Bonnetia jauensis
Bonnetia kathleenae
Bonnetia lanceifolia
Bonnetia maguireorum
Bonnetia multinervia
Bonnetia rubicunda
Calophyllum apetalum
Calophyllum bifurcatum
Calophyllum bracteatum
Calophyllum caudatum
Calophyllum chapelieri
Calophyllum confusum
Calophyllum cordato-oblongum
Calophyllum havilandii
Calophyllum macrophyllum
Calophyllum mooni
Calophyllum obscurum
Calophyllum parvifolium
Calophyllum robustum
Calophyllum rufinerve
Calophyllum savannarum
Calophyllum thwaitesii
Calophyllum tomentosum
Calophyllum walkeri
Caraipa utilis
Clusia carinata
Clusia clarendonensis
Clusia croatii
Clusia cupulata
Clusia dukei
Clusia longipetiolata
Clusia osseocarpa
Clusia polystigma
Clusia portlandiana
Clusia pseudomangle
Clusia skotaster
Clusia tarmensis
Garcinia acutifolia
Garcinia afzelii
Garcinia brevipedicellata
Garcinia clusiaefolia
Garcinia costata
Garcinia decussata
Garcinia epunctata
Garcinia holttumii
Garcinia indica
Garcinia kola
Garcinia montana
Garcinia quaesita
Garcinia rubro-echinata
Garcinia semseii
Garcinia staudtii
Garcinia travancorica
Garcinia wightii
Hypericum acostanum
Hypericum balfourii
Hypericum callacallanum
Hypericum fieriense
Hypericum gnidiifolium
Hypericum maguirei
Hypericum matangense
Kayea coriacea
Kayea macrophylla
Kielmeyera peruviana
Lebrunia bushaie
Mammea grandifolia
Mammea malayana
Mammea papuana
Mammea papyracea
Mammea timorensis
Mammea usambarensis
Mammea veimauriensis
Marila saramaccana
Marila spiciformis
Mesua kochummenia
Mesua purseglovei
Montrouziera cauliflora
Pentadesma lebrunii
Tovomita chachapoyasensis
Tovomita microcarpa
Tovomita weberbaueri

Varieties

Calophyllum carrii var. carrii
Calophyllum carrii var. longigemmatum
Garcinia terpnophylla var. acuminata
Garcinia terpnophylla var. terpnophylla

Other Theales species

Anthodiscus chocoensis
Asteropeia mcphersonii
Caryocar costaricense
Dialyceras coriaceum
Marcgraviastrum gigantophyllum
Pelliciera rhizophorae
Quiina colonensis
Rhaptopetalum belingense
Rhaptopetalum sindarense
Rhopalocarpus undulatus

Linales

Erythroxylum incrassatum
Erythroxylum jamaicense
Erythroxylum kochummenii
Erythroxylum obtusifolium
Erythroxylum pacificum
Hugonia macrophylla
Hugonia micans
Ixonanthes chinensis
Ixonanthes khasiana
Linum katiae
Linum muelleri
Vantanea peruviana
Vantanea spichigeri

Malvales
There are 114 species, 13 subspecies, and one variety in the order Malvales assessed as vulnerable.

Malvaceae

Species

Abutilon sachetianum
Acropogon aoupiniensis
Acropogon domatifer
Acropogon fatsioides
Acropogon megaphyllus
Hampea breedlovei
Hampea micrantha
Hampea reynae
Hibiscus greenwayi
Hibiscus holstii
Hibiscus malacophyllus
Hibiscus masasianus
Hibiscus scottii
Nototriche ecuadoriensis
Robinsonella brevituba
Robinsonella mirandae
Robinsonella samaricarpa
Wercklea intermedia

Subspecies
Hibiscus kokio subsp. kokio

Sterculiaceae

Brachychiton carruthersii
Brachychiton velutinosus
Byttneria jaramilloana
Byttneria sparrei
Cola bracteata
Cola duparquetiana
Cola gigas
Cola glabra
Cola hypochrysea
Cola letestui
Cola mossambicensis
Cola reticulata
Cola scheffleri
Cola suboppositifolia
Cola umbratilis
Dombeya amaniensis
Dombeya longebracteolata
Eriolaena lushingtonii
Firmiana hainanensis
Heritiera longipetiolata
Heritiera parvifolia
Heritiera utilis
Hildegardia cubensis
Hildegardia perrieri
Nesogordonia bernieri
Nesogordonia papaverifera
Nesogordonia thouarsii
Pterospermum reticulatum
Pterygota bequaertii
Pterygota macrocarpa
Scaphium longiflorum
Scaphopetalum parvifolium
Sterculia alexandri
Sterculia oblonga, Yellow sterculia
Sterculia schliebenii

Bombacaceae

Bombacopsis quinata
Ceiba rosea
Cullenia ceylanica
Durio acutifolius
Durio dulcis
Durio grandiflorus
Durio kutejensis
Durio pinangianus
Durio testudinarius
Eriotheca peruviana
Huberodendron patinoi
Kostermansia malayana, Durian tuang
Matisia stenopetala
Phragmotheca rubriflora
Quararibea dolichosiphon
Quararibea pterocalyx, Wild palm
Quararibea velutina
Rhodognaphalon brevicuspe

Sarcolaenaceae
Schizolaena parviflora
Schizolaena pectinata

Tiliaceae

Asterophorum mennegae
Brownlowia kleinhovioidea
Burretiodendron esquirolii
Burretiodendron hsienmu
Diplodiscus paniculatus
Grewia aldabrensis
Grewia bilocularis
Grewia milleri
Grewia salicifolia
Grewia turbinata
Microcos erythrocarpa
Microcos globulifera
Mollia glabrescens
Pentace acuta
Pentace exima
Pentace microlepidota
Pentace perakensis
Schoutenia kunstleri

Elaeocarpaceae

Species

Elaeocarpus acmosepalus
Elaeocarpus apiculatus
Elaeocarpus brigittae
Elaeocarpus colnettianus
Elaeocarpus dinagatensis
Elaeocarpus eriobotryoides
Elaeocarpus fraseri
Elaeocarpus gigantifolius
Elaeocarpus glandulifer
Elaeocarpus inopinatus
Elaeocarpus miriensis
Elaeocarpus moratii
Elaeocarpus prunifolius
Elaeocarpus recurvatus
Elaeocarpus royenii
Elaeocarpus rugosus
Elaeocarpus simaluensis
Elaeocarpus subvillosus
Elaeocarpus venustus
Sloanea acutiflora
Sloanea gracilis
Sloanea lepida
Sloanea suaveolens

Subspecies

Elaeocarpus beccarii subsp. beccarii
Elaeocarpus beccarii subsp. nitens
Elaeocarpus beccarii subsp. sumatrana
Elaeocarpus submonoceras subsp. fusicarpus
Elaeocarpus submonoceras subsp. oxypyren
Elaeocarpus submonoceras subsp. procerus
Elaeocarpus submonoceras subsp. submonoceras
Elaeocarpus teysmannii subsp. domatiferus
Elaeocarpus teysmannii subsp. moluccensis
Elaeocarpus teysmannii subsp. morowalensis
Elaeocarpus teysmannii subsp. rhizophorus
Elaeocarpus teysmannii subsp. teysmannii

Varieties
Elaeocarpus calomala var. pustulatus

Geraniales

Species

Biophytum heinrichsae
Dirachma socotrana
Erodium rupicola
Geranium chimborazense
Geranium ecuadoriense
Geranium guamanense
Geranium holm-nielsenii
Geranium loxense
Geranium sericeum
Impatiens flammea
Impatiens morsei
Impatiens sakeriana
Oxalis dines
Oxalis rufescens
Sarcotheca ochracea
Tropaeolum asplundii
Tropaeolum brideanum
Tropaeolum huigrense
Tropaeolum leonis
Tropaeolum magnificum
Tropaeolum papillosum

Subspecies
Impatiens hydrogetonoides subsp. kituloensis
Varieties

Sarcotheca laxa var. brigittae
Sarcotheca laxa var. hirsuta
Sarcotheca laxa var. laxa
Sarcotheca laxa var. sericea

Lecythidales

Species

Abdulmajidia chaniana
Abdulmajidia maxwelliana
Barringtonia payensiana
Bertholletia excelsa, Brazil nut
Cariniana integrifolia
Cariniana legalis
Cariniana pachyantha
Cariniana uaupensis
Corythophora labriculata
Couratari calycina
Couratari guianensis, Fine-leaf wadara
Couratari longipedicellata
Couratari sandwithii
Couratari scottmorii
Couratari tauari
Crateranthus talbotii
Eschweilera alvimii
Eschweilera amazonicaformis
Eschweilera baguensis
Eschweilera beebei
Eschweilera bogotensis
Eschweilera boltenii
Eschweilera carinata
Eschweilera fanshawei
Eschweilera integricalyx
Eschweilera mexicana
Eschweilera rhododendrifolia
Eschweilera rimbachii
Eschweilera rionegrense
Eschweilera rodriguesiana
Eschweilera roraimensis
Eschweilera sclerophylla
Eschweilera squamata
Eschweilera subcordata
Eschweilera tetrapetala
Eschweilera venezuelica
Foetidia macrocarpa
Grias colombiana
Grias haughtii
Grias multinervia
Gustavia acuminata
Gustavia erythrocarpa
Gustavia foliosa
Gustavia fosteri
Gustavia pubescens
Gustavia santanderiensis
Gustavia sessilis
Gustavia verticillata
Lecythis barnebyi
Lecythis brancoensis
Lecythis parvifructa
Lecythis schomburgkii
Lecythis schwackei
Napoleonaea egertonii

Subspecies
Gustavia nana subsp. rhodantha
Gustavia speciosa subsp. occidentalis

Polygalales

Species

Bunchosia cauliflora
Bunchosia jamaicensis
Bunchosia linearifolia
Hiraea perplexa
Malpighia harrisii
Malpighia obtusifolia
Mezia tomentosa
Monnina equatoriensis
Monnina loxensis
Monnina obovata
Monnina pseudoaestuans
Polygala kuriensis
Ptilochaeta nudipes
Qualea calantha
Qualea impexa
Securidaca leiocarpa
Spachea correae
Xanthophyllum bullatum
Xanthophyllum sulphureum

Subspecies
Polygala tenuicaulis subsp. tenuicaulis
Varieties
Bunchosia hartwegiana var. brevisurcularis

Santalales

Species

Acanthosyris asipapote
Agelanthus longipes
Agelanthus pennatulus
Agonandra loranthoides
Agonandra macrocarpa
Dendrophthora bulbifera
Dendrophthora polyantha
Dendrophthora sumacoi
Dendrophthora tenuifolia
Dulacia crassa
Englerina drummondii
Englerina triplinervia
Erianthemum alveatum
Erianthemum lindense
Erianthemum occultum
Malania oleifera
Medusandra richardsiana
Octoknema orientalis
Okoubaka michelsonii
Oncella curviramea
Oncella gracilis
Phoradendron canzacotoi
Phoradendron pomasquianum
Santalum album, Sandalwood
Schoepfia harrisii
Tapinanthus letouzeyi
Tapinanthus preussii
Thesium maritimum, Coastal bastard toad-flax
Ximenia roigii

Subspecies
Englerina heckmanniana subsp. heckmanniana
Varieties

Santalum haleakalae var. haleakalae, Haleakala sandalwood
Santalum haleakalae var. lanaiense
Santalum insulare var. hendersonensis
Santalum insulare var. marchionense

Proteales
There are 26 species and one subspecies in the order Proteales assessed as vulnerable.

Proteaceae

Species

Beauprea crassifolia
Euplassa isernii
Euplassa occidentalis
Helicia acutifolia
Helicia australasica
Helicia calocoma
Helicia grandifolia
Helicia neglecta
Helicia peekelii
Helicia retusa
Helicia rostrata
Heliciopsis cockburnii
Heliciopsis rufidula
Kermadecia pronyensis
Leucadendron argenteum
Macadamia neurophylla
Mimetes arboreus
Mimetes chrysanthus, Golden pagoda
Protea curvata
Protea laetans
Protea lanceolata
Roupala loxensis
Roupala pinnata
Roupala sphenophyllum

Subspecies
Protea aurea subsp. potbergensis

Elaeagnaceae
Elaeagnus mollis
Elaeagnus tarokoensis

Dipsacales

Dipsacus narcisseanus
Heptacodium miconioides
Sambucus tigranii, Tigran's elder
Sinadoxa corydalifolia
Valeriana buxifolia
Valeriana cernua
Valeriana coleophylla
Viburnum arboreum
Viburnum tridentatum

Plumbaginales

Armeria sampaioi
Dyerophytum pendulum
Dyerophytum socotranum
Limonium duriaei
Limonium ornatum
Limonium palmyrense
Limonium perezii

Rubiales

Species

Afrocanthium keniense
Afrocanthium kilifiense
Afrocanthium shabanii
Afrocanthium siebenlistii
Afrocanthium vollesenii
Alleizettella rubra
Allenanthus hondurensis
Aoranthe penduliflora
Atractocarpus platyxylon
Belonophora talbotii
Bertiera pauloi
Bobea sandwicensis
Breonia lowryi
Bullockia impressinervia
Byrsophyllum ellipticum
Calochone acuminata
Calycosiphonia macrochlamys
Canthium carinatum
Chassalia albiflora
Chassalia petitiana
Chazaliella obanensis
Cinchona lucumifolia
Cinchona rugosa
Coffea costatifructa
Coffea fadenii
Coffea macrocarpa
Coffea mongensis
Coffea pocsii
Coffea pseudozanguebariae
Coffea schliebenii
Coffea togoensis
Coffea zanguebariae, Ibo coffee
Condaminea glabrata
Condaminea microcarpa
Coprosma oliveri
Coprosma pyrifolia
Coprosma wallii
Coussarea mexicana
Craterispermum longipedunculatum
Craterispermum montanum
Cuviera migeodii
Cuviera talbotii
Cuviera tomentosa
Cyclophyllum tenuipes
Elaeagia ecuadorensis
Elaeagia pastoensis
Empogona acidophylla
Empogona africana
Empogona concolor
Empogona talbotii
Erithalis quadrangularis
Exostema triflorum
Faramea exemplaris
Gaertnera cardiocarpa
Gaertnera darcyana
Gaertnera drakeana
Gaertnera rosea
Gaertnera walkeri
Gaillonia putorioides
Galium azuayicum
Galium cracoviense
Galium sudeticum
Gardenia hillii
Gardenia remyi, Remy's gardenia
Gardenia transvenulosa
Gonzalagunia pauciflora
Guettarda comata
Guettarda frangulifolia
Guettarda noumeana
Hamelia papillosa
Hymenocoleus glaber
Ixora albersii
Ixora foliosa
Ixora jucunda
Ixora malabarica
Ixora margaretae
Ixora nigerica
Joosia longisepala
Joosia macrocalyx
Joosia oligantha
Kadua cordata
Keetia koritschoneri
Keetia purpurascens
Kotchubaea montana
Kraussia socotrana
Kraussia speciosa
Ladenbergia acutifolia
Ladenbergia ferruginea
Ladenbergia gavanensis
Ladenbergia stenocarpa
Ladenbergia ulei
Lasianthus ciliatus
Lasianthus gardneri
Lasianthus grandifolius
Lasianthus pedunculatus
Lasianthus rostratus
Lasianthus wallacei
Litosanthes capitulatus
Macrocnemum cinchonoides
Macrocnemum pilosinervium
Mastixiodendron stoddardii
Mitragyna ledermannii
Mitragyna stipulosa
Morinda asteroscepa
Mouretia tonkinensis
Multidentia castaneae
Multidentia sclerocarpa
Nargedia macrocarpa
Nauclea diderrichii
Ochreinauclea missionis
Oldenlandia ocellata
Oxyanthus montanus
Palicourea anderssoniana
Palicourea anianguana
Palicourea asplundii
Palicourea azurea
Palicourea calantha
Palicourea calothyrsus
Palicourea calycina
Palicourea canarina
Palicourea candida
Palicourea consobrina
Palicourea corniculata
Palicourea cornigera
Palicourea gentryi
Palicourea herrerae
Palicourea jaramilloi
Palicourea latifolia
Palicourea lobbii
Palicourea prodiga
Palicourea sodiroi
Palicourea tectoneura
Palicourea wilesii
Pauridiantha divaricata
Pauridiantha insularis
Pauridiantha venusta
Pavetta axillipara
Pavetta holstii
Pavetta intermedia
Pavetta lasioclada
Pavetta linearifolia
Pavetta lynesii
Pavetta manyanguensis
Pavetta mollissima
Pavetta monticola
Pavetta nitidissima
Pavetta sparsipila
Pavetta tarennoides
Phyllopentas ledermannii
Polysphaeria macrantha
Portlandia harrisii
Pseudosabicea batesii
Pseudosabicea medusula
Pseudosabicea pedicellata
Psychotria alsophila
Psychotria camerunensis
Psychotria cathetoneura
Psychotria crassipetala
Psychotria cyathicalyx
Psychotria dasyophthalma
Psychotria deverdiana
Psychotria domatiata
Psychotria dubia
Psychotria elachistantha
Psychotria foetens
Psychotria fusiformis
Psychotria greenwelliae
Psychotria guerkeana
Psychotria hierniana
Psychotria lanceifolia
Psychotria lepiniana
Psychotria megalopus
Psychotria megistantha
Psychotria pervillei
Psychotria peteri
Psychotria petitii
Psychotria plicata
Psychotria podocarpa
Psychotria pseudoplatyphylla
Psychotria stenophylla
Psychotria taitensis
Psychotria waasii
Psychotria woytkowskii
Psydrax dicoccos
Psydrax faulknerae
Psydrax kibuwae
Psydrax micans
Psydrax montanum
Psydrax paradoxa
Psydrax suborbicularis
Pyrostria socotrana
Randia pancheriana
Rhipidantha chlorantha
Robynsia glabrata
Rondeletia adamsii
Rondeletia elegans
Rondeletia galeottii
Rondeletia hirsuta
Rondeletia hirta
Rondeletia pallida
Rondeletia peruviana
Rondeletia portlandensis
Rondeletia racemosa
Rondeletia subsessilifolia
Rothmannia macrosiphon
Rudgea crassifolia
Rudgea microcarpa
Rudgea obesiflora
Rudgea stenophylla
Rustia alba
Rustia viridiflora
Rutidea nigerica
Rytigynia binata
Rytigynia caudatissima
Rytigynia eickii
Rytigynia hirsutiflora
Rytigynia nodulosa
Rytigynia pseudolongicaudata
Sabicea pyramidalis
Saprosma fragrans
Schradera campii
Schumanniophyton problematicum
Simira wurdackii
Stenostomum portoricense
Stenostomum radiatum
Stenostomum sintenisii
Tarenna drummondii
Tarenna luhomeroensis
Tarenna nilagirica
Tarenna quadrangularis
Temnocalyx nodulosa
Tocoyena pittieri
Tricalysia atherura
Tricalysia obstetrix
Tricalysia pedicellata
Tricalysia schliebenii
Trichostachys interrupta
Urophyllum ellipticum
Vangueria bicolor
Vangueria induta
Vangueria pallidiflora
Vangueriopsis longiflora

Subspecies

Aulacocalyx pallens subsp. pallens
Canthium oligocarpum subsp. intermedium
Coffea mufindiensis subsp. mufindiensis
Heinsenia diervilleoides subsp. mufindiensis
Ixora scheffleri subsp. scheffleri
Lasianthus kilimandscharicus subsp. laxinervis
Oxyanthus lepidus subsp. kigogoensis
Oxyanthus pyriformis subsp. brevitubus
Oxyanthus pyriformis subsp. tanganyikensis
Pachystigma loranthifolium subsp. loranthifolium
Pausinystalia lane-poolei subsp. lane-poolei
Pavetta johnstonii subsp. breviloba
Pavetta sphaerobotrys subsp. lanceisepala
Pavetta sphaerobotrys subsp. sphaerobotrys
Pavetta sphaerobotrys subsp. tanaica
Rytigynia bugoyensis subsp. glabriflora
Rytigynia lichenoxenos subsp. glabrituba
Rytigynia lichenoxenos subsp. lichenoxenos
Tricalysia coriacea subsp. angustifolia
Vangueria randii subsp. vollesenii
Vangueria rufescens subsp. angustiloba

Varieties

Afrocanthium racemulosum var. nanguanum
Canthium neilgherrense var. neilgherrense
Empogona ovalifolia var. glabrata
Empogona ovalifolia var. taylorii
Mussaenda microdonta var. microdonta
Mussaenda monticola var. glabrescens
Mussaenda monticola var. monticola
Pavetta abyssinica var. usambarica
Pavetta comostyla var. matengoana
Pavetta comostyla var. nyassica
Pavetta kyimbilensis var. iringensis
Pavetta kyimbilensis var. kyimbilensis
Pavetta macrosepala var. macrosepala
Pavetta macrosepala var. puberula
Pavetta sepium var. massaica
Pavetta sepium var. sepium
Pavetta subumbellata var. subcoriacea
Psychotria goetzei var. goetzei
Psychotria goetzei var. platyphylla
Randia aculeata var. jamaicensis
Rytigynia adenodonta var. adenodonta
Rytigynia adenodonta var. reticulata
Rytigynia celastroides var. nuda
Sericanthe odoratissima var. odoratissima
Sericanthe odoratissima var. ulugurensis
Tricalysia anomala var. anomala
Tricalysia anomala var. montana
Vangueria volkensii var. kyimbilensis

Violales
There are 86 species, one subspecies, and three varieties in Violales assessed as vulnerable.

Flacourtiaceae

Species

Banara brasiliensis
Bennettiodendron cordatum
Casearia crassinervis
Casearia engleri
Casearia flavovirens
Casearia macrocarpa
Casearia mannii
Casearia megacarpa
Casearia wynadensis
Dasylepis integra
Dovyalis xanthocarpa
Homalium dalzielii
Homalium gracilipes
Homalium kunstleri
Homalium leratiorum
Homalium ogoouense
Homalium patoklaense
Homalium rubiginosum
Homalium sleumerianum
Homalium smythei
Homalium taypau
Homalium travancoricum
Homalium undulatum
Hydnocarpus annamensis
Hydnocarpus filipes
Hydnocarpus hainanensis
Hydnocarpus humei
Hydnocarpus octandra
Hydnocarpus pentandrus
Laetia micrantha
Lasiochlamys mandjeliana
Lasiochlamys pseudocoriacea
Lunania cubensis
Lunania polydactyla
Lunania racemosa
Oncoba lophocarpa, synonym of Caloncoba lophocarpa
Rawsonia burtt-davyi
Ryparosa fasciculata
Samyda glabrata
Samyda villosa
Scolopia steenisiana
Trichadenia zeylanica
Xylosma boulindae
Xylosma kaalaensis
Xylosma molesta
Xylosma palawanensis
Xylosma proctorii
Xylosma serpentina
Xylosma tuberculata

Subspecies
Hydnocarpus macrocarpa subsp. macrocarpa
Varieties
Homalium lacticum var. glabratum
Xylotheca tettensis var. fissistyla

Violaceae

Species

Allexis cauliflora
Allexis obanensis
Rinorea brachythrix
Rinorea longistipulata
Rinorea oraria
Rinorea pectino-squamata
Rinorea ramiziana
Rinorea thomasii
Rinorea thomensis
Rinorea ulmifolia
Rinorea uxpanapana
Viola athois
Viola chamissoniana

Varieties
Rinorea convallarioides var. marsabitensis

Loasaceae

Nasa amaluzensis
Nasa asplundii
Nasa auca
Nasa glabra
Nasa hornii
Nasa jungifolia
Nasa modesta
Nasa rufipila
Nasa tabularis

Passifloraceae

Basananthe zanzibarica
Passiflora ampullacea
Passiflora deltoifolia
Passiflora eggersii
Passiflora hirtiflora
Passiflora jamesonii
Passiflora jatunsachensis
Passiflora roseorum
Passiflora sanctae-barbarae
Passiflora trochlearis

Other Violales species

Afrostyrax lepidophyllus
Ancistrocladus grandiflorus
Ancistrocladus letestui
Helianthemum alypoides
Vasconcellea palandensis

Euphorbiales
There are 236 species, five subspecies, and 33 varieties in Euphorbiales assessed as vulnerable.

Peraceae
Chaetocarpus coriaceus

Buxaceae
Buxus arborea
Buxus obtusifolia

Euphorbiaceae

Species

Acalypha andina
Acalypha hontauyuensis
Acalypha lepinei
Acalypha suirenbiensis
Acalypha tunguraguae
Acidocroton verrucosus
Agrostistachys coriacea
Alchornea sodiroi
Amanoa bracteosa
Amanoa strobilacea
Andrachne schweinfurthii
Antidesma obliquinervium, syn. of Antidesma montanum var. montanum
Antidesma pyrifolium
Antidesma subolivaceum
Aporosa cardiosperma
Aporosa lanceolata
Aristogeitonia monophylla
Austrobuxus cracens
Baccaurea glabrifolia
Baccaurea odoratissima
Bridelia kurzii, syn. of Bridelia ovata
Bridelia moonii
Bridelia whitmorei
Cephalocroton socotranus
Cephalomappa sinensis
Cleidiocarpon cavaleriei
Cleidion lochmios
Cleidion marginatum
Cleidion veillonii
Cleistanthus bracteosus
Cleistanthus collinus
Cleistanthus evrardii
Cleistanthus ferrugineus
Cleistanthus glandulosus
Cleistanthus glaucus
Cleistanthus malabaricus
Cleistanthus parvifolius
Cleistanthus petelotii
Cocconerion minus
Croton aubrevillei
Croton coriaceus
Croton dictyophlebodes
Croton elegans
Croton jatrophoides
Croton kelantanicus
Croton lucidus
Croton phuquocensis
Croton sarcocarpus
Croton sordidus
Croton stellulifer
Croton sulcifructus
Croton touranensis
Crotonogyne strigosa
Crotonogyne zenkeri
Discoclaoxylon occidentale
Drypetes afzelii
Drypetes detersibilis
Drypetes gerrardinoides
Drypetes glabra
Drypetes henriquesii
Drypetes molundana
Drypetes nervosa
Drypetes obanensis
Drypetes oxyodonta
Drypetes palawanensis
Drypetes pellegrinii
Drypetes perakensis
Drypetes preussii
Drypetes sclerophylla
Drypetes singroboensis
Drypetes staudtii
Drypetes wightii
Erythrococca columnaris
Euphorbia alfredii
Euphorbia ambarivatoensis
Euphorbia ambovombensis
Euphorbia ammak
Euphorbia analalavensis
Euphorbia annamarieae
Euphorbia apurimacensis
Euphorbia atoto
Euphorbia atrococca
Euphorbia aureoviridiflora
Euphorbia banae
Euphorbia beharensis
Euphorbia bemarahaensis
Euphorbia benoistii
Euphorbia biaculeata
Euphorbia biselegans
Euphorbia boissieri
Euphorbia boiteaui
Euphorbia bongolavensis
Euphorbia bosseri
Euphorbia bourgaeana
Euphorbia bulbispina
Euphorbia bwambensis
Euphorbia capuronii
Euphorbia cedrorum
Euphorbia cremersii
Euphorbia cussonioides
Euphorbia delphinensis
Euphorbia denisiana
Euphorbia doloensis
Euphorbia ensifolia
Euphorbia famatamboay
Euphorbia fianarantsoae
Euphorbia gottlebei
Euphorbia grandidieri
Euphorbia hajhirensis
Euphorbia handiensis
Euphorbia hildebrandtii
Euphorbia hofstaetteri
Euphorbia itremensis
Euphorbia jamesonii
Euphorbia kuriensis
Euphorbia leistneri
Euphorbia leuconeura
Euphorbia lividiflora
Euphorbia lophogona
Euphorbia mahabobokensis
Euphorbia mahafalensis
Euphorbia mangelsdorffii
Euphorbia martinae
Euphorbia melanocarpa
Euphorbia meuleniana
Euphorbia moratii
Euphorbia namuskluftensis
Euphorbia neoarborescens
Euphorbia nereidum
Euphorbia noxia
Euphorbia obcordata
Euphorbia otjipembana
Euphorbia paulianii
Euphorbia pellegrinii
Euphorbia perrieri
Euphorbia pervittata
Euphorbia platyclada
Euphorbia primulifolia
Euphorbia randrianjohanyi
Euphorbia rauhii
Euphorbia retrospina
Euphorbia rossii
Euphorbia sachetiana
Euphorbia sakarahaensis
Euphorbia salota
Euphorbia skottsbergii
Euphorbia socotrana
Euphorbia sparsiflora
Euphorbia subpeltatophylla
Euphorbia thouarsiana
Euphorbia thulinii
Euphorbia trichophylla
Euphorbia uniglans
Euphorbia vajravelui
Euphorbia vezorum
Euphorbia waringiae
Euphorbia zakamenae
Excoecaria benthamiana
Glochidion bourdillonii
Glochidion carrickii
Glochidion grantii
Glochidion insulare
Glochidion johnstonei
Glochidion manono
Glochidion nadeaudii
Glochidion pitcairnense
Glochidion stylosum
Glochidion symingtonii
Grimmeodendron jamaicense
Grossera elongata
Gymnanthes glandulosa
Hamilcoa zenkeri
Hieronyma macrocarpa
Homalanthus polyandrus, Kermadec poplar
Hieronyma jamaicensis
Jatropha bullockii
Jatropha chamelensis
Jatropha divaricata, Wild oil nut
Jatropha hildebrandtii
Jatropha nana
Joannesia princeps
Lasiocroton fawcettii
Lasiocroton harrisii
Macaranga beillei
Macaranga bicolor
Macaranga caudatifolia
Macaranga congestiflora
Macaranga conglomerata
Macaranga grandifolia
Macaranga huahineensis
Macaranga paxii
Mallotus atrovirens
Mallotus fuscescens
Meineckia capillipes
Meineckia nguruensis
Meineckia ovata
Meineckia stipularis
Micrococca scariosa
Mildbraedia carpinifolia
Paranecepsia alchorneifolia
Parodiodendron marginivillosum
Phyllanthus bathianus
Phyllanthus bernieranus
Phyllanthus cauliflorus
Phyllanthus cryptophilus
Phyllanthus deplanchei
Phyllanthus eximius
Phyllanthus indofischeri
Phyllanthus mananarensis
Phyllanthus profusus
Phyllanthus rangoloakensis
Pseudagrostistachys africana
Ptychopyxis triradiata, synonym of Ptychopyxis bacciformis
Pycnocoma littoralis
Pycnocoma macrantha
Reutealis trisperma
Sapium aubrevillei
Sapium bourgeaui
Sapium luzonicum
Sapium saltense
Sapium triloculare
Sebastiania alpina
Sebastiania huallagensis
Securinega flexuosa
Sibangea pleioneura
Suregada lithoxyla
Tannodia swynnertonii
Tetrorchidium ulugurense
Trigonostemon arboreus, synonym of Omphalea malayana
Trigonostemon fragilis

Subspecies

Croton longipedicellatus subsp. austrotanzanicus
Euphorbia enterophora subsp. crassa
Euphorbia famatamboay subsp. famatamboay
Euphorbia famatamboay subsp. itampolensis
Euphorbia orthoclada subsp. vepretorum

Varieties

Drypetes natalensis var. leiogyna
Drypetes usambarica var. mrimae
Drypetes usambarica var. trichogyna
Drypetes usambarica var. usambarica
Euphorbia beharensis var. beharensis
Euphorbia beharensis var. guillemetii
Euphorbia beharensis var. squarrosa
Euphorbia beharensis var. truncata
Euphorbia bicompacta var. bicompacta
Euphorbia boivinii var. minor
Euphorbia celastroides var. laehiensis
Euphorbia celastroides var. lorifolia
Euphorbia celastroides var. stokesii
Euphorbia cremersii var. cremersii
Euphorbia cremersii var. rakotozafyi
Euphorbia decaryi var. ampanihyensis
Euphorbia decaryi var. spirosticha
Euphorbia duranii var. ankaratrae
Euphorbia francoisii var. crassicaulis
Euphorbia lophogona var. lophogona
Euphorbia mahafalensis var. xanthadenia
Euphorbia milii var. roseana
Euphorbia moratii var. antsingiensis
Euphorbia moratii var. bemarahaensis
Euphorbia moratii var. moratii
Euphorbia moratii var. multiflora
Euphorbia platyclada var. hardyi
Euphorbia platyclada var. platyclada
Euphorbia primulifolia var. primulifolia
Mallotus oppositifolius var. lindicus
Margaritaria anomala var. cheloniphorbe
Phyllanthus kaessneri var. kaessneri
Ricinodendron heudelotii var. tomentellum

Laurales
There are 136 species and three varieties in the order Laurales assessed as vulnerable.

Monimiaceae

Mollinedia engleriana
Mollinedia glabra
Mollinedia marquetiana
Siparuna cascada
Siparuna croatii
Siparuna guajalitensis
Siparuna multiflora

Hernandiaceae
Hernandia catalpifolia
Hernandia stokesii

Lauraceae

Species

Actinodaphne albifrons
Actinodaphne ellipticibacca
Actinodaphne fragilis
Actinodaphne johorensis
Actinodaphne lawsonii
Aiouea bracteata
Aiouea macedoana
Alseodaphne hainanensis
Alseodaphne micrantha
Alseodaphne paludosa
Aniba ferrea
Aniba ferruginea
Aniba intermedia
Aniba novo-granatensis
Aniba percoriacea
Aniba santalodora
Aniba vaupesiana
Aniba vulcanicola
Beilschmiedia ambigua
Beilschmiedia bracteata
Beilschmiedia brevipes
Beilschmiedia giorgii
Beilschmiedia kweo
Beilschmiedia mayumbensis
Beilschmiedia membranacea
Beilschmiedia ugandensis
Beilschmiedia vermoesenii
Cinnadenia malayana
Cinnamomum capparu-coronde
Cinnamomum litseifolium
Cinnamomum macrocarpum
Cinnamomum macrostemon
Cinnamomum mathewsii
Cinnamomum mercadoi, Cinamomon
Cinnamomum osmophloeum
Cinnamomum parviflorum
Cinnamomum perrottetii
Cinnamomum reticulatum
Cinnamomum riparium
Cinnamomum sulphuratum
Cryptocarya beddomei
Cryptocarya stocksii
Cryptocarya wightiana
Dicypellium caryophyllaceum
Endiandra lecardii
Endiandra scrobiculata
Eusideroxylon zwageri, Billian
Licaria cubensis
Licaria velutina
Litsea claviflora
Litsea gardneri
Litsea gracilis
Litsea iteodaphne
Litsea leytensis
Litsea ligustrina
Litsea longifolia
Mezilaurus ita-uba
Mezilaurus navalium
Nectandra angusta
Nectandra apiculata
Nectandra astyla
Nectandra barbellata
Nectandra brittonii
Nectandra brochidodroma
Nectandra canaliculata
Nectandra citrifolia
Nectandra dasystyla
Nectandra filiflora
Nectandra fulva
Nectandra grisea
Nectandra guadaripo
Nectandra heterotricha
Nectandra hirtella
Nectandra hypoleuca
Nectandra latissima
Nectandra matogrossensis
Nectandra matudai
Nectandra micranthera
Nectandra mirafloris
Nectandra olida
Nectandra paranaensis
Nectandra parviflora
Nectandra pseudocotea
Nectandra ramonensis
Nectandra reflexa
Nectandra rudis
Nectandra smithii
Nectandra sordida
Nectandra subbullata
Nectandra wurdackii
Neolitsea fischeri
Neolitsea mollissima
Neolitsea vidalii
Nothaphoebe condensa
Ocotea argylei
Ocotea benthamiana
Ocotea catharinensis
Ocotea kenyensis
Ocotea langsdorffii
Ocotea otuzcensis
Ocotea porosa
Ocotea pretiosa
Ocotea raimondii
Ocotea rivularis
Ocotea robertsoniae
Ocotea rotundata
Ocotea uxpanapana
Ocotea viridiflora
Persea brenesii
Persea campii
Persea floccosa
Persea glabra
Persea julianae
Persea nudigemma
Persea obtusifolia
Persea philippinensis
Persea ruizii
Persea schiedeana, Coyo avocado
Phoebe chekiangensis
Phoebe poilanei
Phoebe zhennan
Pleurothyrium hexaglandulosum
Potameia lotungensis
Povedadaphne quadriporata
Sassafras randaiense
Urbanodendron verrucosum

Varieties

Actinodaphne campanulata var. campanulata
Persea podadenia var. glabriramea
Umbellularia californica var. fresnensis

Cucurbitales
There are 49 species in the order Cucurbitales assessed as vulnerable.

Begoniaceae

Begonia adpressa
Begonia aequatorialis
Begonia bataiensis
Begonia brandbygeana
Begonia cavaleriei
Begonia compacticaulis
Begonia dentatobracteata
Begonia dodsonii
Begonia duncan-thomasii
Begonia exalata
Begonia geminiflora
Begonia hemsleyana
Begonia heterochroma
Begonia holmnielseniana
Begonia lugonis
Begonia mbangaensis
Begonia microsperma
Begonia napoensis
Begonia neoharlingii
Begonia oellgaardii
Begonia oxyanthera
Begonia parcifolia
Begonia pectennervia
Begonia preussii
Begonia secunda
Begonia seychellensis
Begonia sparreana
Begonia tetrandra
Begonia truncicola
Begonia xerophyta
Begonia ynesiae
Begonia zenkeriana

Cucurbitaceae

Cucurbita ecuadorensis
Dendrosicyos socotranus, Cucumber tree
Eureiandra balfourii
Momordica enneaphylla

Anisophylleaceae

Anisophyllea apetala
Anisophyllea cabole
Anisophyllea chartacea
Anisophyllea cinnamomoides
Anisophyllea curtisii
Anisophyllea ferruginea
Anisophyllea globosa
Anisophyllea grandis
Anisophyllea impressinervia
Anisophyllea nitida
Anisophyllea reticulata
Anisophyllea rhomboidea
Combretocarpus rotundatus

Ebenales
There are 226 species, eight subspecies, and five varieties in Ebenales assessed as vulnerable.

Symplocaceae

Species

Symplocos baehnii
Symplocos bractealis
Symplocos buxifolioides
Symplocos calycodactylos
Symplocos canescens
Symplocos chloroleuca
Symplocos clethrifolia
Symplocos coccinea
Symplocos cordifolia
Symplocos costata
Symplocos fuscata
Symplocos hispidula
Symplocos lugubris
Symplocos mezii
Symplocos peruviana
Symplocos rimbachii
Symplocos subandina
Symplocos tacanensis
Symplocos trichoclada
Symplocos tubulifera
Symplocos verrucisurcula

Subspecies
Symplocos macrocarpa subsp. kanarana
Varieties

Symplocos coronata var. coronata
Symplocos coronata var. glabrifolia
Symplocos cuneata var. acuta
Symplocos cuneata var. cuneata

Sapotaceae

Species

Baillonella toxisperma, African pearwood
Chrysophyllum acreanum
Chrysophyllum albipilum
Chrysophyllum paranaense
Chrysophyllum pauciflorum
Chrysophyllum revolutum
Chrysophyllum splendens
Delpydora macrophylla
Ecclinusa lancifolia
Ecclinusa orinocoensis
Ecclinusa parviflora
Gluema ivorensis
Lecomtedoxa nogo
Leptostylis multiflora
Leptostylis petiolata
Madhuca aristulata
Madhuca betis
Madhuca fulva
Madhuca hainanensis
Madhuca longistyla
Madhuca moonii
Madhuca oblongifolia
Madhuca obovatifolia
Madhuca pasquieri
Madhuca penicillata
Madhuca ridleyi
Madhuca rufa
Madhuca sessiliflora
Manilkara bolivarensis
Manilkara cavalcantei
Manilkara excelsa
Manilkara maxima
Manilkara pleeana
Manilkara pubicarpa
Manilkara valenzuelana
Micropholis brochidodroma
Micropholis compta
Micropholis polita
Micropholis resinifera
Micropholis spectabilis
Micropholis venamoensis
Mimusops acutifolia
Mimusops riparia
Neohemsleya usambarensis
Nesoluma polynesicum, Island nesoluma
Nesoluma st.-johnianum
Northia hornei
Palaquium bataanense
Palaquium bourdillonii
Palaquium grande
Palaquium impressionervium
Palaquium luzoniense, Red nato
Palaquium mindanaense
Palaquium neoebudicum
Palaquium pauciflorum
Palaquium philippense
Palaquium rubiginosum
Palaquium thwaitesii
Palaquium zeylanicum
Pouteria amygdalina
Pouteria arcuata
Pouteria areolatifolia
Pouteria arguacoensium
Pouteria aristata
Pouteria austin-smithii
Pouteria bapeba
Pouteria belizensis
Pouteria benai
Pouteria bonneriana
Pouteria briocheoides
Pouteria bullata
Pouteria calistophylla
Pouteria chiricana
Pouteria collina
Pouteria congestifolia
Pouteria crassiflora
Pouteria filiformis
Pouteria fossicola
Pouteria foveolata
Pouteria furcata
Pouteria glauca
Pouteria gracilis
Pouteria kaieteurensis
Pouteria krukovii
Pouteria leptopedicellata
Pouteria longifolia
Pouteria lucens
Pouteria macrocarpa
Pouteria microstrigosa
Pouteria nemorosa
Pouteria nudipetala
Pouteria oppositifolia
Pouteria pachyphylla
Pouteria penicillata
Pouteria peruviensis
Pouteria petiolata
Pouteria pisquiensis
Pouteria pseudoracemosa
Pouteria puberula
Pouteria pubescens
Pouteria putamen-ovi
Pouteria rufotomentosa
Pouteria semecarpifolia
Pouteria sessilis
Pouteria silvestris
Pouteria sipapoensis
Pouteria squamosa
Pouteria triplarifolia
Pouteria vernicosa
Pouteria villamilii, White nato
Pradosia cuatrecasasii
Pradosia granulosa
Pradosia montana
Pradosia subverticillata
Pycnandra francei
Pycnandra kaalaensis
Sarcaulus inflexus
Sarcaulus oblatus
Sarcaulus vestitus
Sarcaulus wurdackii
Sideroxylon acunae
Sideroxylon altamiranoi
Sideroxylon anomalum
Sideroxylon bullatum
Sideroxylon confertum
Sideroxylon dominicanum
Sideroxylon durifolium
Sideroxylon eucoriaceum
Sideroxylon fimbriatum
Sideroxylon hirtiantherum
Sideroxylon ibarrae
Sideroxylon jubilla
Sideroxylon mirmulano
Sideroxylon peninsulare
Sideroxylon socorrense
Sideroxylon stevensonii
Spiniluma discolor
Synsepalum aubrevillei
Synsepalum glycydora
Synsepalum kassneri
Vincentella densiflora, synonym of Synsepalum revolutum
Vitellaria paradoxa, Shea butter tree
Vitellariopsis cuneata
Vitellariopsis ferruginea
Vitellariopsis kirkii

Subspecies

Manilkara jaimiqui subsp. haitensis
Manilkara jaimiqui subsp. jaimiqui
Manilkara jaimiqui subsp. wrightiana
Pouteria dictyoneura subsp. dictyoneura
Sideroxylon floribundum subsp. belizense
Sideroxylon floribundum subsp. floribundum
Sideroxylon inerme subsp. cryptophlebia

Varieties
Pouteria alnifolia var. sacleuxii

Ebenaceae

Diospyros acuminata
Diospyros albiflora
Diospyros amaniensis
Diospyros atrata
Diospyros barberi
Diospyros barteri
Diospyros blumutensis
Diospyros boutoniana
Diospyros candolleana
Diospyros celebica, Indonesian ebony
Diospyros chaetocarpa
Diospyros cherrieri
Diospyros conformis
Diospyros daemona
Diospyros fastidiosa
Diospyros feliciana
Diospyros gambleana
Diospyros greenwayi
Diospyros hirsuta
Diospyros impolita
Diospyros insidiosa
Diospyros kingii
Diospyros kupensis
Diospyros leucomelas
Diospyros margaretae
Diospyros melanida
Diospyros nebulosa
Diospyros neraudii
Diospyros oblongifolia
Diospyros paniculata
Diospyros perplexa
Diospyros platanoides
Diospyros pterocalyx
Diospyros pustulata
Diospyros quaesita
Diospyros revaughanii
Diospyros selangorensis
Diospyros tero
Diospyros tessellaria, Black ebony
Diospyros thwaitesii
Diospyros trichophylla
Diospyros trisulca
Diospyros walkeri
Euclea balfourii
Euclea laurina

Styracaceae

Halesia macgregorii
Huodendron parvifolium
Pamphilia vilcabambae
Pterostyrax psilophyllus, Small epaulette tree
Sinojackia dolichocarpa, Changiostyrax dolichocarpa
Sinojackia xylocarpa
Styrax argyrophyllus
Styrax crotonoides
Styrax ferax
Styrax foveolaria
Styrax fraserensis
Styrax litseoides
Styrax mathewsii
Styrax peruvianum
Styrax socialis
Styrax tafelbergensis

Celastrales
There are 102 species, three subspecies, and ten varieties in the order Celastrales assessed as vulnerable.

Icacinaceae

Alsodeiopsis schumannii
Cantleya corniculata
Chlamydocarya soyauxii
Desmostachys vogelii
Gomphandra comosa
Mappia racemosa
Metteniusa cundinamarcensis
Metteniusa edulis
Metteniusa huilensis
Metteniusa santanderensis

Hollies

Species

Ilex abscondita
Ilex acutidenticulata
Ilex anonoides
Ilex aracamuniana
Ilex attenuata
Ilex brevipedicellata
Ilex caniensis
Ilex costaricensis
Ilex cowanii
Ilex ericoides
Ilex florifera
Ilex glabella
Ilex guaiquinimae
Ilex holstii
Ilex jelskii
Ilex karuaiana
Ilex lasseri
Ilex lechleri
Ilex maingayi
Ilex mathewsii
Ilex neblinensis
Ilex palawanica
Ilex pallida
Ilex parvifructa
Ilex praetermissa
Ilex puberula
Ilex quercetorum
Ilex tolucana
Ilex trachyphylla
Ilex vaccinoides
Ilex vulcanicola

Subspecies
Ilex perado subsp. platyphylla
Ilex vomitoria subsp. chiapensis
Varieties
Ilex mitis var. schliebenii
Ilex savannarum var. morichei

Celastraceae

Species

Bhesa ceylanica
Campylostemon mitophorus
Elaeodendron laneanum, Bermuda olivewood
Euonymus angulatus
Euonymus huangii
Euonymus lanceifolia
Euonymus walkeri
Glyptopetalum lawsonii
Glyptopetalum palawanense
Gyminda orbicularis
Gymnosporia bachmannii
Kokoona coriacea
Kokoona leucoclada
Kokoona sabahana
Kokoona sessilis
Lophopetalum sessilifolium
Maytenus abbottii
Maytenus curtissii
Maytenus harenensis
Maytenus matudai
Maytenus microcarpa
Maytenus oleosa
Maytenus ponceana
Maytenus sp. A
Maytenus stipitata
Microtropis argentea
Microtropis borneensis
Microtropis fascicularis
Microtropis keningauensis
Microtropis rigida
Microtropis sabahensis
Microtropis sarawakensis
Microtropis tenuis
Peritassa killipii
Perrottetia excelsa
Pleurostylia serrulata
Pseudosalacia streyi
Salacia arenicola
Salacia lebrunii
Salacia lenticellosa
Salacia lucida
Salacia miegei
Salacia nigra
Salacia oblonga
Salacia volubilis
Sarawakodendron filamentosum
Thyrsosalacia racemosa
Zinowiewia madsenii

Subspecies
Elaeodendron pininsulare subsp. poyaense
Varieties

Kokoona littoralis var. bakoensis
Kokoona littoralis var. longifolia
Maytenus arbutifolia var. sidamoensis
Microtropis grandifolia var. grandifolia
Microtropis grandifolia var. longipetiolatus
Salacia lehmbachii var. manus-lacertae
Salacia lehmbachii var. pes-ranulae
Salacia lehmbachii var. uregaensis

Dichapetalaceae

Dichapetalum asplundeanum
Dichapetalum bocageanum
Dichapetalum costaricense
Dichapetalum oliganthum
Dichapetalum reticulatum
Stephanopodium longipedicellatum
Stephanopodium magnifolium
Tapura arachnoidea
Tapura carinata
Tapura ivorensis
Tapura letestui
Tapura neglecta
Tapura orbicularis

Myrtales
There are 357 species, 13 subspecies, and 11 varieties in the order Myrtales assessed as vulnerable.

Myrtaceae

Species

Acca lanuginosa
Austromyrtus horizontalis
Austromyrtus lotoides
Calycolpus excisus
Calycorectes wurdackii
Calyptranthes brevispicata
Calyptranthes capitata
Calyptranthes crebra
Calyptranthes ekmanii
Calyptranthes luquillensis, Luquillo forest lidflower
Calyptranthes nodosa
Calyptranthes polyneura
Calyptranthes umbelliformis
Calyptranthes wilsonii
Campomanesia aromatica
Campomanesia espiritosantensis
Campomanesia neriiflora
Campomanesia phaea
Cupheanthus microphyllus
Eugenia amoena
Eugenia benjamina
Eugenia brachythrix
Eugenia brownei
Eugenia burkilliana
Eugenia calcadensis
Eugenia caudata
Eugenia colipensis
Eugenia conglomerata
Eugenia cordifoliolata
Eugenia crenata
Eugenia cyrtophylloides
Eugenia discors
Eugenia fernandopoana
Eugenia fulva
Eugenia gatopensis
Eugenia goniocalyx
Eugenia haniffii
Eugenia heterochroa
Eugenia hexovulata
Eugenia kaalensis
Eugenia lamprophylla
Eugenia longicuspis
Eugenia mackeeana
Eugenia mexicana
Eugenia micranthoides
Eugenia microcarpa
Eugenia mufindiensis
Eugenia ngadimaniana
Eugenia noumeensis
Eugenia pallidula
Eugenia plumbea
Eugenia porphyrantha
Eugenia prasina
Eugenia pseudoclaviflora
Eugenia quadrata
Eugenia rhomboidea
Eugenia rivulorum
Eugenia rottleriana
Eugenia rotundata
Eugenia rufo-fulva
Eugenia schulziana
Eugenia schunkei
Eugenia setosa
Eugenia sp. 'calcarea'
Eugenia swettenhamiana
Eugenia tabouensis
Eugenia tiumanensis
Eugenia toxanatolica
Eugenia umtamvunensis
Eugenia virotii
Krokia pilotoana
Marlierea sintenisii
Metrosideros ochrantha
Metrosideros punctata
Mitranthes clarendonensis
Myrceugenia bracteosa
Myrceugenia brevipedicellata
Myrceugenia campestris
Myrceugenia fernandeziana
Myrceugenia franciscensis
Myrceugenia kleinii
Myrceugenia pilotantha
Myrceugenia rufescens
Myrceugenia schulzei
Myrceugenia scutellata
Myrcia albobrunnea
Myrcia almasensis
Myrcia calcicola
Myrcia crassimarginata
Myrcia fosteri
Myrcia grandiflora
Myrcia lineata
Myrcia pentagona
Myrcianthes callicoma
Myrcianthes oreophila
Myrciaria cuspidata
Myrciaria pliniodes
Myrciaria silveirana
Neomitranthes cordifolia
Neomitranthes langsdorfii
Pimenta adenoclada
Pimenta cainitoides
Pimenta filipes
Pimenta haitiensis
Pimenta obscura
Pimenta odiolens
Pimenta oligantha
Psidium rostratum
Siphoneugena densiflora
Siphoneugena occidentalis
Siphoneugena widgreniana
Syzygium amplifolium
Syzygium benthamianum
Syzygium densiflorum
Syzygium firmum
Syzygium makul
Syzygium micranthum
Syzygium neesianum
Syzygium occidentale
Syzygium oliganthum
Syzygium pondoense
Syzygium poyanum
Syzygium ramavarma
Syzygium rotundifolium
Syzygium spissum
Syzygium wolfii
Syzygium wrightii
Tristania decorticata
Tristania littoralis
Tristaniopsis macphersonii
Tristaniopsis minutiflora
Tristaniopsis reticulata
Tristaniopsis vieillardii
Xanthostemon sulfureus
Xanthostemon verdugonianus

Subspecies

Syzygium cordifolium subsp. cordifolium
Syzygium cordifolium subsp. spissum
Syzygium micklethwaitii subsp. micklethwaitii
Syzygium micklethwaitii subsp. subcordatum

Varieties

Campomanesia schlechtendaliana var. schlechtendaliana
Eugenia harrisii var. harrisii
Eugenia mandevillensis var. mandevillensis
Eugenia mandevillensis var. perratonii
Metrosideros polymorpha var. newellii
Myrcia splendens var. chrysocoma
Pimenta pseudocaryophyllus var. hoehnei
Pimenta racemosa var. hispaniolensis
Pimenta racemosa var. ozua
Psidium rufum var. widgrenianum

Melastomataceae

Species

Aciotis asplundii
Alloneuron dorrii
Alloneuron ecuadorense
Amphiblemma amoenum
Amphiblemma lanceatum
Amphiblemma letouzeyi
Amphiblemma monticola
Amphiblemma soyauxii
Andesanthus gleasonianus, syn. Tibouchina gleasoniana
Astronidium degeneri
Axinaea pauciflora
Axinaea sclerophylla
Blakea campii
Blakea harlingii
Blakea hispida
Blakea madisonii
Blakea oldemanii
Blakea pichinchensis
Blakea rotundifolia
Brachyotum azuayense
Brachyotum benthamianum
Brachyotum fictum
Brachyotum fraternum
Brachyotum gleasonii
Brachyotum gracilescens
Brachyotum harlingii
Brachyotum incrassatum
Brachyotum jamesonii
Brachyotum johannes-julii
Brachyotum rugosum
Brachyotum russatum
Bucquetia nigritella
Centronia brachycera
Centronia laurifolia
Centronia mutisii
Centronia peruviana
Chaetogastra campii, syn. Tibouchina campii
Chaetogastra oroensis, syn. Tibouchina oroensis
Clidemia acostae
Clidemia asplundii
Clidemia imparilis
Clidemia purpurea
Conostegia chiriquensis
Conostegia superba
Dissotis bamendae
Dissotis pobeguinii, Oueleba rose
Graffenrieda caudata
Graffenrieda harlingii
Graffenrieda trichanthera
Gravesia pulchra
Henriettea punctata
Henriettea squamata
Henriettella ininiensis
Huilaea ecuadorensis
Huilaea occidentalis
Leandra pastazana
Memecylon bequaertii
Memecylon candidum
Memecylon cinereum
Memecylon clarkeanum
Memecylon cogniauxii
Memecylon dasyanthum
Memecylon floridum
Memecylon fragrans
Memecylon grande
Memecylon hookeri
Memecylon hullettii
Memecylon kunstleri
Memecylon lawsonii
Memecylon leucanthum
Memecylon macrocarpum
Memecylon myrtilloides
Memecylon ovoideum
Memecylon rostratum
Memecylon rotundatum
Memecylon royenii
Memecylon sylvaticum
Memecylon teitense
Memecylon urceolatum
Memecylon varians
Memecylon verruculosum
Memecylon wallichii
Meriania almedae
Meriania amplexicaulis
Meriania cuneifolia
Meriania furvanthera
Meriania grandiflora
Meriania kirkbridei
Meriania pastazana
Meriania pichinchensis
Meriania rigida
Miconia aequatorialis
Miconia aligera
Miconia alpina
Miconia ayacuchensis
Miconia barclayana
Miconia bipatrialis
Miconia bolivarensis
Miconia brevistylis
Miconia caelata
Miconia cajanumana
Miconia calignosa
Miconia calophylla
Miconia campii
Miconia castillensis
Miconia cosangensis
Miconia crebribullata
Miconia dapsiliflora
Miconia demissifolia
Miconia dissimulans
Miconia explicita
Miconia floccosa
Miconia gibba
Miconia gonioclada
Miconia grayana
Miconia griffisii
Miconia hexamera
Miconia huigrensis
Miconia hylophila
Miconia idiogena
Miconia imitans
Miconia innata
Miconia jorgensenii
Miconia lachnoclada
Miconia laxa
Miconia mediocris
Miconia namandensis
Miconia oellgaardii
Miconia pastazana
Miconia penningtonii
Miconia perelegans
Miconia pernettifolia
Miconia pisinniflora
Miconia poortmannii
Miconia protuberans
Miconia renneri
Miconia rimbachii
Miconia santaritensis
Miconia seticaulis
Miconia setulosa
Miconia sodiroi
Miconia sparrei
Miconia stenophylla
Miconia suborbicularis
Miconia tephrodes
Miconia zamorensis
Mouriri panamensis
Ossaea boekei
Ossaea sparrei
Spathandra barteri
Tetrazygia elegans
Topobea asplundii
Topobea brevibractea
Topobea pascoensis
Triolena pedemontana
Warneckea amaniensis
Warneckea memecyloides
Warneckea mouririifolia

Subspecies

Meriania cuneifolia subsp. cuneifolia
Meriania cuneifolia subsp. subandina
Meriania drakei subsp. chontalensis
Meriania drakei subsp. drakei
Miconia monzoniensis subsp. cuzcoensis
Miconia thaminantha subsp. thaminantha

Combretaceae

Species

Anogeissus dhofarica
Buchenavia hoehneana
Combretum hartmannianum
Combretum rochetianum
Terminalia eddowesii
Terminalia hecistocarpa
Terminalia ivorensis, Black afara
Terminalia januariensis
Terminalia kangeanensis
Terminalia kuhlmannii
Terminalia nitens
Terminalia novocaledonica
Terminalia pallida
Terminalia parviflora
Terminalia pellucida
Terminalia reitzii
Terminalia rerei

Subspecies
Terminalia benzoin subsp. benzoin
Terminalia microcarpa subsp. incana

Thymelaeaceae

Aquilaria banaensae
Aquilaria beccariana
Aquilaria cumingiana
Aquilaria hirta
Aquilaria malaccensis, Aloewood
Aquilaria microcarpa
Aquilaria sinensis
Daphne rodriguezii
Daphnopsis calcicola
Daphnopsis pavonii
Dicranolepis polygaloides
Gnidia decaryana
Gonystylus bancanus
Gonystylus calophylloides
Gonystylus consanguineus
Gonystylus costalis
Gonystylus decipiens
Gonystylus glaucescens
Gonystylus keithii
Gonystylus lucidulus
Gonystylus macrophyllus
Gonystylus nervosus
Gonystylus nobilis
Gonystylus pendulus
Gonystylus spectabilis
Gonystylus stenosepalus
Gonystylus xylocarpus
Stephanodaphne cuspidata

Lythraceae

Species

Ginoria nudiflora
Lafoensia replicata
Lagerstroemia anisoptera
Lagerstroemia intermedia
Nesaea pedicellata
Nesaea petrensis
Punica protopunica, Pomegranate tree
Rotala floribunda
Rotala fontinalis
Rotala smithii

Subspecies
Nesaea triflora subsp. lupembensis
Varieties
Nesaea parkeri var. longifolia

Onagraceae

Fuchsia campii
Fuchsia harlingii
Fuchsia pilaloensis
Fuchsia steyermarkii
Fuchsia summa
Ludwigia anastomosans

Other Myrtales species

Axinandra zeylanica
Rhynchocalyx lawsonioides
Trapa maleevii, Maleev's water-chestnut

Sapindales
There are 345 species, ten subspecies, and 14 varieties in the order Sapindales assessed as vulnerable.

Rutaceae

Species

Amyris polymorpha
Angostura alipes
Boronella koniamboensis
Burkillanthus malaccensis
Chloroxylon swietenia, East Indian satinwood
Citropsis gabunensis
Clausena calciphila
Diphasiopsis fadenii
Dutaillyea amosensis
Esenbeckia leiocarpa
Euodia macrocarpa
Fagara externa
Fagara mayu
Flindersia laevicarpa
Glycosmis longisepala
Glycosmis perakensis
Maclurodendron parviflorum
Maclurodendron pubescens
Melicope hawaiensis
Melicope jugosa
Melicope kaalaensis
Melicope sororia
Melicope subunifoliolata
Melicope wawraeana
Merrillia caloxylon
Monanthocitrus oblanceolata
Oxanthera aurantium
Oxanthera brevipes
Pleiospermium longisepalum
Teclea carpopunctifera
Thamnosma socotrana
Vepris arushensis
Vepris borenensis
Vepris lecomteana
Vepris mandangoa
Vepris samburuensis
Vepris sansibarensis
Vepris trifoliolata
Zanthoxylum albuquerquei
Zanthoxylum atchoum
Zanthoxylum chevalieri
Zanthoxylum deremense
Zanthoxylum dipetalum
Zanthoxylum flavum, West Indian satinwood
Zanthoxylum harrisii
Zanthoxylum hartii
Zanthoxylum holtzianum
Zanthoxylum lindense
Zanthoxylum oahuense, Oahu prickly-ash
Zieria chevalieri

Subspecies
Esenbeckia pentaphylla subsp. australensis
Varieties

Glycosmis chlorosperma var. bidiensis
Ravenia biramosa var. peruviana
Vepris hanangensis var. hanangensis
Vepris hanangensis var. unifoliolata
Vepris morogorensis var. morogorensis

Melianthaceae
Bersama rosea

Aceraceae

Species
Acer duplicatoserratum
Acer miaotaiense
Subspecies

Acer amplum subsp. catalpifolium
Acer miyabei subsp. miaotaiense
Acer negundo subsp. mexicanum

Varieties
Acer oblongum var. microcarpum

Sapindaceae

Species

Alectryon repandodentatus
Allophylus agbala
Allophylus aldabricus
Allophylus bullatus
Allophylus chirindensis
Allophylus pachyphyllus
Allophylus roigii
Allophylus sechellensis
Allophylus zeylanicus
Allophylus zimmermannianus
Arytera nekorensis
Atalaya natalensis, Natal wing-nut
Athyana weinmannifolia
Camptolepis ramiflora
Chytranthus obliquinervis
Cossinia trifoliata
Cupaniopsis acuticarpa
Cupaniopsis bullata
Cupaniopsis euneura
Cupaniopsis globosa
Cupaniopsis napaensis
Cupaniopsis phanerophleibia
Cupaniopsis strigosa
Deinbollia insignis
Deinbollia maxima
Deinbollia molliuscula
Deinbollia rambaensis
Deinbollia saligna
Diplokeleba herzogi
Elattostachys aiyurensis
Elattostachys dzumacensis
Elattostachys erythrocarpum
Elattostachys goropuensis
Elattostachys rubrofructus
Glenniea penangensis
Glenniea unijuga
Guioa asquamosa
Guioa bicolor
Guioa malukuensis
Guioa melanopoda
Guioa molliuscula
Guioa multijuga
Guioa normanbiensis
Guioa novobritannica
Guioa oligotricha
Guioa patentinervis
Guioa pauciflora
Guioa plurinervis
Guioa scalariformis
Guioa unguiculata
Guioa venusta
Guioa waigeoensis
Nephelium costatum
Nephelium hamulatum
Paullinia navicularis
Placodiscus bancoensis
Placodiscus boya
Placodiscus bracteosus
Placodiscus oblongifolius
Placodiscus opacus
Placodiscus paniculatus
Podonephelium plicatum
Sapindus oahuensis
Sinoradlkofera minor

Varieties
Litchi chinensis var. euspontanea

Staphyleaceae

Huertea cubensis
Tapiscia sinensis
Turpinia stipulacea

Anacardiaceae

Species

Antrocaryon micraster, Antrocaryon
Buchanania lanceolata
Buchanania platyneura
Campnosperma zeylanica
Comocladia cordata
Euroschinus aoupiniensis
Euroschinus jaffrei
Faguetia falcata
Gluta papuana
Loxopterygium grisebachii
Mangifera altissima
Mangifera austro-indica
Mangifera dewildei
Mangifera flava
Mangifera macrocarpa
Mangifera minutifolia
Mangifera orophila
Mangifera pajang
Mangifera pedicellata
Mangifera pentandra
Mangifera rufocostata, Asem kiat
Mangifera similis
Mangifera sumbawaensis
Mangifera transversalis
Mangifera zeylanica
Mauria killipii
Mauria trichothyrsa
Melanochyla fasciculiflora
Melanochyla longipetiolata
Operculicarya hirsutissima
Pistacia cucphuongensis
Pistacia mexicana
Rhus coriaria
Rhus sp. A
Schinopsis haenkeana
Schinus venturi
Sclerocarya gillettii
Semecarpus gardneri
Semecarpus marginata
Semecarpus moonii
Semecarpus nigro-viridis
Semecarpus obovata
Semecarpus parvifolia
Semecarpus paucinervius
Semecarpus pubescens, Velvet badulla
Semecarpus subpeltata
Semecarpus walkeri
Tapirira bethanniana
Tapirira chimalapana
Thyrsodium herrerense
Trichoscypha cavalliensis
Trichoscypha engong
Trichoscypha mannii

Varieties

Ozoroa reticulata var. nyasica
Pseudospondias microcarpa var. hirsuta
Schinus gracilipes var. pilosus
Schinus longifolius var. paraguariensis

Meliaceae

Species

Aglaia aherniana
Aglaia amplexicaulis
Aglaia angustifolia
Aglaia apiocarpa
Aglaia archiboldiana
Aglaia australiensis
Aglaia barbanthera
Aglaia basiphylla
Aglaia bourdillonii
Aglaia brassii
Aglaia brownii
Aglaia ceramica
Aglaia chittagonga
Aglaia cinnamomea
Aglaia coriacea
Aglaia costata
Aglaia cremea
Aglaia cumingiana
Aglaia cuspidata
Aglaia densisquama
Aglaia flavescens
Aglaia fragilis
Aglaia integrifolia
Aglaia laxiflora
Aglaia lepiorrhachis
Aglaia leucoclada
Aglaia macrostigma
Aglaia mariannensis
Aglaia membranifolia
Aglaia parksii
Aglaia penningtoniana
Aglaia perviridis
Aglaia polyneura
Aglaia puberulanthera
Aglaia pyriformis
Aglaia ramotricha
Aglaia rivularis
Aglaia rubrivenia
Aglaia saltatorum
Aglaia scortechinii
Aglaia smithii
Aglaia speciosa
Aglaia subsesilis
Aglaia tenuicaulis
Aglaia variisquama
Aglaia yzermannii
Amoora dasyclada
Aphanamixis cumingiana
Cedrela odorata, Spanish cedar
Chisocheton pauciflorus
Chisocheton perakensis
Chisocheton stellatus
Dysoxylum angustifolium
Dysoxylum ficiforme
Dysoxylum palawanensis
Dysoxylum turczaninowii
Entandrophragma angolense
Entandrophragma candollei, Cedar kokoti
Entandrophragma cylindricum, Sapele
Entandrophragma utile
Guarea carapoides
Guarea cartaguenya
Guarea casimiriana
Guarea caulobotrys
Guarea cedrata, Light bossé
Guarea convergens
Guarea cristata
Guarea guentheri
Guarea humaitensis
Guarea jamaicensis
Guarea juglandiformis
Guarea macropetala
Guarea mayombensis
Guarea polymera
Guarea pyriformis
Guarea sphenophylla
Guarea thompsonii, Black guarea
Guarea trunciflora
Guarea velutina
Khaya anthotheca, White mahogany
Khaya grandifoliola
Khaya ivorensis, Lagos mahogany
Khaya senegalensis, Dry zone mahogany
Lovoa trichilioides, African walnut
Malleastrum leroyi
Pseudocarapa championii
Ruagea membranacea
Ruagea ovalis
Sandoricum vidalii
Schmardaea microphylla
Swietenia humilis, Mexican mahogany
Swietenia macrophylla, Big leaf mahogany
Trichilia acuminata
Trichilia areolata
Trichilia bullata
Trichilia casaretti
Trichilia chirriactensis
Trichilia emarginata
Trichilia fasciculata
Trichilia gamopetala
Trichilia hispida
Trichilia magnifoliola
Trichilia micropetala
Trichilia ornithothera
Trichilia pittieri
Trichilia primogenita
Trichilia ramalhoi
Trichilia silvatica
Trichilia solitudinis
Trichilia ulei
Turraea adjanohounii
Turraea socotrana
Turraeanthus africana

Subspecies

Guarea macrophylla subsp. macrophylla
Trichilia lepidota subsp. schumanniana
Trichilia schomburgkii subsp. javariensis
Turraea fischeri subsp. eylesii, Matopos honeysuckle tree

Simaroubaceae

Alvaradoa jamaicensis
Gymnostemon zaizou
Hannoa kitombetombe
Nothospondias staudtii
Picramnia bullata
Picrasma excelsa
Pierreodendron kerstingii
Quassia sanguinea
Samadera bidwillii
Soulamea terminalioides

Burseraceae

Species

Aucoumea klaineana
Boswellia ameero
Boswellia bullata
Boswellia dioscoridis
Boswellia elongata
Boswellia nana
Boswellia ogadensis
Boswellia ovalifoliolata
Boswellia popoviana
Boswellia socotrana
Boswellia sp. A
Bursera aromatica
Bursera malacophylla
Bursera tonkinensis
Canarium fusco-calycinum
Canarium luzonicum
Canarium ovatum
Canarium perlisanum
Canarium pseudodecumanum
Canarium pseudopatentinervium
Canarium pseudopimela
Canarium sarawakanum
Canarium zeylanicum
Commiphora alata
Commiphora chaetocarpa
Commiphora monoica
Dacryodes breviracemosa
Dacryodes elmeri
Dacryodes expansa
Dacryodes igaganga
Dacryodes multijuga
Dacryodes puberula
Haplolobus beccarii
Haplolobus bintuluensis
Haplolobus inaequifolius
Haplolobus kapitensis
Haplolobus leenhoutsii
Haplolobus sarawakanus
Protium connarifolium
Protium correae
Protium inconforme
Protium pittieri
Rosselia bracteata
Santiria dacryodifolia
Santiria impressinervis
Santiria kalkmaniana
Santiria nigricans
Santiria sarawakana
Tetragastris tomentosa

Subspecies
Protium tenuifolium subsp. meleodii
Protium tenuifolium subsp. sessiliflorum
Varieties

Dacryodes macrocarpa var. kostermansii
Dacryodes macrocarpa var. patentinervia
Santiria rubiginosa var. latipetiolata

Hippocastanaceae
Aesculus wangii

Asterales

Species

Achyrocline hallii
Acmella leucantha
Adenostemma harlingii
Adenostemma zakii
Aequatorium jamesonii
Aequatorium limonense
Aequatorium rimachianum
Aetheolaena rosana
Ageratina cuencana
Ageratina dendroides
Ageratum iltisii
Anacyclus pyrethrum, Atlas daisy
Anaphalis beddomei
Anaphalis leptophylla
Anaphalis wightiana
Aphanactis antisanensis
Argyroxiphium caliginis, Eke silversword
Argyroxiphium sandwicense, Silversword
Aristeguietia arborea
Artemisia molinieri
Aster miyagii
Ayapana ecuadorensis
Ayapanopsis luteynii
Baccharis hambatensis
Baccharis hieronymi
Barnadesia aculeata
Bidens amplectens
Bidens campylotheca, Ko`oko`olau
Bidens conjuncta
Bidens eatonii
Bidens mannii
Bidens micrantha
Bidens molokaiensis, Molokai beggarticks
Bidens populifolia, Oahu beggarticks
Blepharispermum hirtum
Brachyglottis huntii, Chatham Island Christmas tree
Brachyglottis pentacopa
Cacosmia harlingii
Cacosmia hieronymi
Calea harlingii
Calea kingii
Canariothamnus hermosae
Carlina onopordifolia
Carthamus balearicus
Centaurea corymbosa
Centaurea daralagoezica, Daralagezian tomanthea
Centaurea dubjanskyi
Centaurea gadorensis
Centaurea immanuelis-loewii
Centaurea jankae
Centaurea kalambakensis
Centaurea niederi
Centaurea peucedanifolia
Centaurea pulvinata
Cheirolophus satarataensis
Cheirolophus tagananensis
Cirsium ducellieri
Cirsium oblongifolium, Oblong-leaved thistle
Cirsium trachylepis, Rough-scaly thistle
Clibadium alatum
Clibadium harlingii
Clibadium manabiense
Clibadium napoense
Clibadium pastazense
Clibadium sprucei
Clibadium zakii
Commidendrum rugosum, Scrubwood
Cotula filifolia
Cotula moseleyi
Cousinia woronowii, Voronov's cousinia
Crassocephalum bauchiense
Crepis purpurea
Critonia eggersii
Critoniopsis cotopaxensis
Critoniopsis harlingii
Critoniopsis jaramilloi
Critoniopsis palaciosii
Critoniopsis sevillana
Cronquistianthus bulliferus
Cronquistianthus niveus
Cronquistianthus origanoides
Darwiniothamnus alternifolius
Dasphyllum argenteum
Dendrophorbium balsapampae
Dendrophorbium dodsonii
Dendrophorbium ingens
Dendrophorbium pericaule
Dendrophorbium pururu
Dendrophorbium scytophyllum
Dendrophorbium solisii
Diplostephium asplundii
Diplostephium barclayanum
Dubautia reticulata, Net-veined dubautia
Echinops foliosus, Polyphyllous globe thistle
Erato sodiroi
Fitchia nutans
Fitchia tahitensis
Fleischmannia aequinoctialis
Fleischmannia harlingii
Fleischmannia lloensis
Floscaldasia azorelloides
Gnaphalium chimborazense
Grosvenoria hypargyra
Grosvenoria rimbachii
Guevaria alvaroi
Gynoxys azuayensis
Gynoxys baccharoides
Gynoxys chimborazensis
Gynoxys chingualensis
Gynoxys colanensis
Gynoxys dielsiana
Gynoxys jaramilloi
Gynoxys laurifolia
Gynoxys miniphylla
Gynoxys multibracteifera
Gynoxys pulchella
Gynoxys reinaldii
Gynoxys rimbachii
Gynura sechellensis
Hebeclinium obtusisquamosum
Helichrysum biafranum
Helichrysum gossypinum
Helichrysum nimmoanum
Helichrysum sp. A
Helichrysum sp. B
Helichrysum suffruticosum
Hieracium pangoriense
Jacobaea buschiana, Groundsel of Busch
Joseanthus sparrei
Jungia ovata
Jurinea alata, Winged jurinea
Jurinea bellidioides, English daisy-like jurinea
Jurinea brachypappa, Short-thistledowned jurinea
Jurinea coronopifolia, Wart-cress-leaved jurinea
Jurinea exuberans, Profuse jurinea
Jurinea woronowii, Voronov's jurinea
Kemulariella abchasica, Abkhazian kemulariella
Kemulariella colchica, Colchic kemulariella
Kleinia scottii
Koyamacalia pseudotaimingasa
Lactuca singularis
Lactuca tetrantha
Launaea crepoides
Lecocarpus lecocarpoides
Leontodon microcephalus
Liabum barclayae
Lopholaena deltombei
Loricaria ollgaardii
Loricaria scolopendra
Melanodendron integrifolium, Black cabbage tree
Mikaniopsis maitlandii
Mikaniopsis vitalba
Monactis holwayae
Monactis lojaensis
Monactis pallatangensis
Monticalia befarioides
Monticalia microdon
Monticalia rosmarinifolia
Munnozia asplundii
Munnozia campii
Munnozia liaboides
Mutisia discoidea
Mutisia magnifica
Mutisia microcephala
Mutisia microphylla
Mutisia rimbachii
Nananthea perpusilla
Notonia shevaroyensis
Oblivia ceronii
Oligactis asplundii
Oligactis ecuadoriensis
Oritrophium llanganatense
Oritrophium ollgaardii
Pappobolus ecuadoriensis
Pappobolus juncosae
Pappobolus nigrescens
Pappobolus sanchezii
Paragynoxys regis
Pentacalia carchiensis
Pentacalia carmelana
Pentacalia corazonensis
Pentacalia dorrii
Pentacalia floribunda
Pentacalia hillii
Pentacalia hurtadoi
Pentacalia lanceolifolia
Pentacalia luteynorum
Pentacalia millei
Pentacalia moronensis
Pentacalia napoensis
Pentacalia palaciosii
Pentacalia ruficaulis
Pentacalia sevillana
Pentacalia zakii
Pentacalia zamorana
Phalacraea ecuadorensis
Plagiocheilus peduncularis
Plagius flosculosus
Pluchea obovata
Psephellus erivanensis, Yerevanian centaury
Psephellus kolakovskyi, Kolakovsky's psephellus
Pseudogynoxys sodiroi
Pulicaria vieraeoides
Santolina elegans
Scalesia aspera
Scalesia baurii, Pinta sunflower-tree
Scalesia crockeri
Scalesia helleri
Scalesia incisa
Scalesia pedunculata
Scalesia retroflexa
Scalesia stewartii, Stewart's scalesia
Scalesia villosa, Longhaired scalesia
Sciadocephala asplundii
Scorzonera czerepanovii, Czerepanov's scorzonera
Senecio caespitosus
Solanecio gynuroides
Stevia bertholdii
Stevia crenata
Verbesina kingii
Verbesina pseudoclausseni
Verbesina rivetii
Verbesina rupestris
Verbesina saloyensis
Vernonia bamendae
Vernonia unicata
Vernonia zollingerianoides
Viguiera sodiroi
Werneria graminifolia
Xenophyllum rigidum
Xenophyllum roseum

Subspecies

Argyroxiphium sandwicense subsp. macrocephalum
Bidens campylotheca subsp. campylotheca
Centaurea attica subsp. megarensis
Darwiniothamnus lancifolius subsp. glabriusculus
Scalesia baurii subsp. baurii
Scalesia baurii subsp. hopkinsii
Scalesia helleri subsp. helleri
Scalesia helleri subsp. santacruzinua

Varieties
Bidens hendersonensis var. hendersonensis
Bidens hendersonensis var. subspathulata

Magnoliales
There are 270 species, 55 subspecies, and 28 varieties in the order Magnoliales assessed as vulnerable.

Canellaceae

Species
Cinnamodendron corticosum
Warburgia stuhlmannii
Subspecies
Warburgia ugandensis subsp. longifolia

Winteraceae

Drimys confertifolia
Zygogynum cristatum
Zygogynum tanyostigma

Magnoliaceae

Species

Magnolia albosericea
Magnolia amoena
Magnolia annamensis
Magnolia bankardiorum
Magnolia blaoensis
Magnolia costaricensis
Magnolia cubensis
Magnolia cylindrica
Magnolia dodecapetala
Magnolia hongheensis
Magnolia iltisiana
Magnolia kwangsiensis
Magnolia mannii
Magnolia mexicana
Magnolia minor
Magnolia multinervia
Magnolia nilagirica
Magnolia nitida
Magnolia odora, Tsong's tree
Magnolia rajaniana
Magnolia sapaensis
Magnolia sargentiana
Magnolia schiedeana
Magnolia talamancana
Magnolia thailandica
Magnolia yoroconte

Subspecies

Magnolia guatemalensis subsp. guatemalensis
Magnolia guatemalensis subsp. hondurensis
Magnolia sieboldii subsp. sinensis
Magnolia sororum subsp. lutea
Magnolia sororum subsp. sororum

Varieties
Magnolia fordiana var. forrestii

Annonaceae

Species

Alphonsea lucida
Alphonsea monogyna
Annona asplundiana
Annona atabapensis
Annona cristalensis
Annona deminuta
Annona dolichophylla
Annona ekmanii
Annona praetermissa, Wild sour sop
Annona spraguei
Boutiquea platypetala
Cleistopholis staudtii
Cremastosperma longicuspe
Cremastosperma megalophyllum
Cremastosperma peruvianum
Cymbopetalum baillonii
Cymbopetalum torulosum
Dasymaschalon scandens
Duguetia barteri
Duguetia schulzii
Enicosanthum acuminatum
Enicosanthum cupulare
Enicosanthum macranthum
Enicosanthum praestigiosum
Goniothalamus calycinus
Goniothalamus holttumii
Goniothalamus hookeri
Goniothalamus macrocalyx
Goniothalamus majestatis
Goniothalamus montanus
Goniothalamus salicinus
Guatteria eriopoda
Guatteria panamensis
Guatteria ramiflora
Guatteria stenopetala
Isolona deightonii
Isolona dewevrei
Isolona linearis
Isolona pleurocarpa
Isolona zenkeri
Malmea cuspidata
Miliusa nilagirica
Miliusa parviflora
Miliusa zeylanica
Mitrephora caudata
Mitrephora fragrans
Mitrephora grandiflora
Mitrephora lanotan
Mitrephora wangii
Mkilua fragrans
Monanthotaxis trichantha
Monodora unwinii
Mosannona pachiteae
Neostenanthera hamata
Oncodostigma hainanense
Ophrypetalum odoratum
Orophea palawanensis
Orophea submaculata
Orophea uniflora
Piptostigma calophyllum
Piptostigma fugax
Piptostigma giganteum
Piptostigma oyemense
Polyalthia elmeri
Polyalthia palawanensis
Polyalthia stuhlmannii
Pseudoxandra williamsii
Pseuduvaria cerina
Pseuduvaria nervosa
Pseuduvaria prainii
Richella hainanensis
Rollinia amazonica
Rollinia bahiensis
Rollinia chrysocarpa
Rollinia hispida
Rollinia occidentalis
Rollinia pickelii
Saccopetalum prolificum
Unonopsis magnifolia
Uvaria lungonyana
Uvaria tanzaniae
Uvariastrum zenkeri
Uvariodendron anisatum
Uvariodendron giganteum
Uvariodendron kirkii
Uvariodendron occidentale
Uvariopsis tripetala
Uvariopsis vanderystii
Xylopia africana
Xylopia arenaria
Xylopia ekmanii
Xylopia elliotii
Xylopia pierrei
Xylopia richardii
Xylopia talbotii

Subspecies
Asteranthe asterias subsp. triangularis

Myristicaceae

Species

Cephalosphaera usambarensis
Endocomia canarioides
Endocomia virella
Gymnacranthera canarica
Horsfieldia ampla
Horsfieldia ampliformis
Horsfieldia amplomontana
Horsfieldia androphora
Horsfieldia ardisiifolia
Horsfieldia atjehensis
Horsfieldia borneensis
Horsfieldia clavata
Horsfieldia decalvata
Horsfieldia disticha
Horsfieldia elongata
Horsfieldia flocculosa
Horsfieldia fragillima
Horsfieldia fulva
Horsfieldia gracilis
Horsfieldia hirtiflora
Horsfieldia iriana
Horsfieldia longiflora
Horsfieldia macilenta
Horsfieldia motleyi
Horsfieldia nervosa
Horsfieldia obscura
Horsfieldia pachyrachis
Horsfieldia paucinervis
Horsfieldia perangusta
Horsfieldia pulcherrima
Horsfieldia punctata
Horsfieldia rufo-lanata
Horsfieldia sabulosa
Horsfieldia samarensis
Horsfieldia sepikensis
Horsfieldia squamulosa
Horsfieldia sterilis
Horsfieldia talaudensis
Horsfieldia tenuifolia
Horsfieldia triandra
Horsfieldia tristis
Horsfieldia urceolata
Horsfieldia valida
Iryanthera obovata
Knema alvarezii
Knema austrosiamensis
Knema bengalensis
Knema celebica
Knema communis
Knema conica
Knema emmae
Knema hookerana
Knema kostermansiana
Knema krusemaniana
Knema lamellaria
Knema lampongensis
Knema longepilosa
Knema mamillata
Knema matanensis
Knema minima
Knema mixta
Knema mogeana
Knema muscosa
Knema pachycarpa
Knema pedicellata
Knema pierrei
Knema plumulosa
Knema poilanei
Knema psilantha
Knema retusa
Knema riangensis
Knema ridsdaleana
Knema rufa
Knema saxatilis
Knema sericea
Knema sessiflora
Knema squamulosa
Knema steenisii
Knema stenocarpa
Knema stylosa
Knema subhirtella
Knema tonkinensis
Knema uliginosa
Knema viridis
Myristica alba
Myristica ampliata
Myristica andamanica
Myristica arfakensis
Myristica atresens
Myristica basilanica
Myristica brachypoda
Myristica brevistipes
Myristica buchneriana
Myristica byssacea
Myristica ceylanica
Myristica coacta
Myristica colinridsdalei
Myristica corticata
Myristica dactyloides
Myristica dasycarpa
Myristica devogelii
Myristica extensa
Myristica fasciculata
Myristica fissurata
Myristica flavovirens
Myristica frugifera
Myristica inaequalis
Myristica incredibilis
Myristica inundata
Myristica kjellbergii
Myristica lasiocarpa
Myristica leptophylla
Myristica longipetiolata
Myristica malabarica
Myristica mediterranea
Myristica millepunctata
Myristica nana
Myristica olivacea
Myristica ornata
Myristica ovicarpa
Myristica pachycarpidia
Myristica papillatifolia
Myristica perlaevis
Myristica petiolata
Myristica philippensis
Myristica pilosella
Myristica pilosigemma
Myristica polyantha
Myristica psilocarpa
Myristica pubicarpa
Myristica pygmaea
Myristica robusta
Myristica sarcantha
Myristica schlechteri
Myristica simulans
Myristica sinclairii
Myristica sogeriensis
Myristica tamrauensis
Myristica trianthera
Myristica ultrabasica
Myristica verruculosa
Staudtia pterocarpa
Virola parvifolia

Subspecies

Horsfieldia penangiana subsp. obtusifolia
Horsfieldia penangiana subsp. penangiana
Horsfieldia sucosa subsp. bifissa
Horsfieldia xanthina subsp. macrophylla
Horsfieldia xanthina subsp. xanthina
Knema andamanica subsp. andamanica
Knema andamanica subsp. nicobarica
Knema andamanica subsp. peninsularis
Knema korthalsii subsp. rimosa
Knema kunstleri subsp. coriacea
Knema kunstleri subsp. leptophylla
Knema kunstleri subsp. macrophylla
Knema kunstleri subsp. pseudostellata
Knema latericia subsp. latericia
Knema oblongata subsp. parviflora
Knema oblongata subsp. pedunculata
Knema pectinata subsp. vestita
Knema rigidifolia subsp. camerona
Knema stellata subsp. minahassae
Knema stellata subsp. stellata
Knema tenuinervia subsp. kanburiensis
Knema tridactyla subsp. pachydactyla
Knema tridactyla subsp. salicifolia
Knema tridactyla subsp. sublaevis
Knema tridactyla subsp. tridactyla
Myristica agusanensis subsp. squamulosa
Myristica crassipes subsp. marronia
Myristica duplopunctata subsp. duplopunctata
Myristica duplopunctata subsp. versteeghii
Myristica fugax subsp. fugax
Myristica fugax subsp. septentrionalis
Myristica fusiformis subsp. fusiformis
Myristica fusiformis subsp. pseudostipitata
Myristica kajewski subsp. robusta
Myristica laevis subsp. badia
Myristica laevis subsp. laevis
Myristica lancifolia subsp. australiana
Myristica lancifolia subsp. kutubuensis
Myristica malaccensis subsp. papillosa
Myristica rosselensis subsp. minutiflora
Myristica simiarum subsp. calcarea
Myristica tenuivenia subsp. lignosa
Myristica tristis subsp. ingambitense
Myristica tristis subsp. louisiadensis
Myristica tristis subsp. sessilifructa
Myristica velutina subsp. breviflora
Myristica warburgii subsp. hybrida
Myristica warburgii subsp. siphonantha

Varieties

Horsfieldia glabra var. javanica
Horsfieldia glabra var. oviflora
Horsfieldia hellwigii var. brachycarpa
Horsfieldia moluccana var. pubescens
Horsfieldia moluccana var. robusta
Horsfieldia pallidicaula var. macrocarya
Horsfieldia pallidicaula var. microcarya
Horsfieldia pallidicaula var. pallidicaula
Horsfieldia polyspherula var. maxima
Horsfieldia subtilis var. rostrata
Horsfieldia tuberculata var. crassivalva
Knema ashtonii var. ashtonii
Knema ashtonii var. cinnamomea
Knema curtisii var. amoena
Knema curtisii var. arenosa
Knema curtisii var. paludosa
Knema glauca var. riparia
Knema hirtella var. pilocarpa
Myristica mediovibex var. kosteriana
Myristica mediovibex var. mediovibex
Myristica rubrinervis var. duplex
Myristica rubrinervis var. rubrinervis
Myristica rumphii var. florentis
Myristica subalulata var. hagensis
Myristica subalulata var. leptantha
Myristica subalulata var. pedunculata
Myristica subcordata var. rimosa

Degeneriaceae
Degeneria vitiensis

Capparales
There are 41 species and five subspecies in Capparales assessed as vulnerable.

Capparaceae

Boscia arabica
Capparis mollicella
Capparis sandwichiana, Native caper
Capparis sprucei
Maerua elegans

Moringaceae
Moringa arborea

Cruciferae

Species

Alyssum pyrenaicum
Arabis kazbegi, Kazbegian rock-cress
Barbamine ketzkhovelii, Ketskhoveli's barbarea
Biscutella neustriaca
Biscutella vincentina
Brassica glabrescens
Callothlaspi abchasicum, Abkhazian callothlaspi
Cardamine lojanensis
Cochlearia tatrae, Tatra scurvy-grass
Crambe arborea
Crambe gomerae
Crambe scaberrima
Draba meskhetica, Meskhetian whitelow grass
Draba splendens
Draba spruceana
Draba steyermarkii
Draba stylosa
Erysimum caspicum, Caspian treacle mustard
Erysimum contractum, Constricted treacle mustard
Erysimum pieninicum
Farsetia inconspicua
Farsetia socotrana
Hemicrambe townsendii
Iberis runemarkii
Isatis platyloba
Lachnocapsa spathulata
Lepidium ecuadoriense
Lepidium quitense
Lepidium violaceum
Noccaea sintenisii, Sintensis' penny-cress
Parolinia schizogynoides
Rorippa hayanica
Sameraria glastifolia, Sameraria
Sisymbrium cavanillesianum
Sterigmostemum acanthocarpum, Prickly-fruited sterigmostemum

Subspecies

Cardamine pratensis subsp. atlantica
Nasturtium africanum subsp. africanum
Nasturtium africanum subsp. mesatlanticum
Sisymbrella aspera subsp. munbyana

Resedaceae

Subspecies
Reseda battandieri subsp. limicola

Apiales
There are 108 species in the order Apiales assessed as vulnerable.

Araliaceae

Aralia chinensis
Aralia debilis
Aralia javanica
Aralia malabarica
Aralia tibetana
Brassaiopsis minor
Brassaiopsis simplex
Cheirodendron forbesii
Cussonia bancoensis
Cussonia gamtoosensis
Dendropanax alberti-smithii
Dendropanax blakeanus
Dendropanax lanceifolius
Dendropanax marginiferus
Dendropanax ovalifolius
Dendropanax portlandianus
Dendropanax productus
Dendropanax sessiliflorus
Macropanax chienii
Macropanax concinnus
Meryta choristantha
Meryta lucida
Meryta pauciflora, Rarotonga meryta
Meryta sinclairii
Meryta sonchifolia
Myodocarpus angustialatus
Oreopanax arcanus
Oreopanax candamoanus
Oreopanax cissoides
Oreopanax echinops
Oreopanax hedraeostrobilus
Oreopanax ischnolobus
Oreopanax jelskii
Oreopanax obscurus
Oreopanax oerstedianus
Oreopanax peltatus
Oreopanax raimondii
Oreopanax rosei
Oreopanax sanderianus
Oreopanax sessiliflorus
Oreopanax stenophyllus
Osmoxylon arrhenicum
Osmoxylon chrysanthum
Osmoxylon corneri
Osmoxylon ellipsoideum
Osmoxylon lanceolatum
Osmoxylon reburrum
Osmoxylon whitmorei
Pentapanax castanopsisicola, synonym of Aralia castanopsicola
Plerandra nono
Plerandra polydactylis
Plerandra sp. "taomensis"
Plerandra sp. "tronchetii"
Plerandra veitchii
Polyscias crassa
Polyscias crenata
Polyscias kikuyuensis, Parasol tree
Polyscias prolifera
Polyscias pulgarense
Polyscias sechellarum
Pseudopanax scopoliae
Pseudosciadium balansae, Delarbrea balansae
Schefflera apioidea
Schefflera beccariana
Schefflera brenesii
Schefflera capitulifera
Schefflera chapana
Schefflera costata
Schefflera diplodactyla
Schefflera dolichostyla
Schefflera euryphylla
Schefflera gleasonii
Schefflera hierniana
Schefflera mannii
Schefflera multinervia
Schefflera nervosa
Schefflera sp. 'nanocephala'
Schefflera stolzii
Schefflera troyana
Schefflera urbaniana
Sinopanax formosanus
Tetrapanax tibetanus

Umbelliferae

Berula bracteata, Jellico
Bupleurum capillare
Bupleurum kosopolianskyi, Kozo-poljanskyi's thoroughwax
Bupleurum wittmannii, Wittmann's thoroughwax
Carum grossheimii, Grossheim's caraway
Carum lacuum
Cotopaxia asplundii
Cryptotaenia flahaultii, Flahault's cryptotaenia
Eryngium variifolium
Ferula caucasica, Caucasian giant fennel
Ferula latipinna
Hydrocotyle hexagona
Hydrocotyle yanghuangensis
Lefebvrea droopii
Lefebvrea kupense
Mandenovia komarovii, Komarov's mandenovia
Nirarathamnos asarifolius
Oreofraga morrisiana
Pimpinella lazica, Lazian burnet saxifrage
Pimpinella schatilensis, Shatilian anise
Rughidia milleri
Seseli cuneifolium, Wedge-leaved meadow saxifrage
Seseli saxicolum, Saxicolous seseli
Thorella verticillato-inundata

Gentianales
There are 108 species and one variety in the order Gentianales assessed as vulnerable.

Apocynaceae

Alafia whytei
Allomarkgrafia ecuatoriana
Alstonia beatricis
Alstonia breviloba
Alstonia henryi, synonym of Alstonia sebusii
Alstonia penangiana
Alstonia rubiginosa
Aspidosperma curranii
Callichilia monopodialis
Cerberiopsis obtusifolia
Dictyophleba setosa
Dyera polyphylla
Isonema bucholzii
Kibatalia elmeri
Kibatalia gitingensis
Kibatalia macgregori
Kibatalia merrilliana
Kibatalia villosa
Kibatalia wigmani
Kopsia lancifolia
Kopsia singapurensis, White kopsia
Kopsia sleesiana
Kopsia tenuis
Landolphia flavidiflora
Landolphia maxima
Malouetia isthmica, synonym of Malouetia quadricasarum
Melodinus axillaris
Melodinus yunnanensis
Neisosperma brevituba
Ochrosia grandiflora
Pachypodium brevicaule
Pleioceras orientale
Pleioceras zenkeri
Pteralyxia macrocarpa, Ridged pteralyxia
Stemmadenia pauli
Strempeliopsis arborea
Tabernaemontana antheonycta
Tabernaemontana cordata
Tabernaemontana hallei
Tabernaemontana ochroleuca
Tabernaemontana oppositifolia
Tabernaemontana remota
Willughbeia cirrhifera
Wrightia lanceolata
Wrightia lecomtei
Wrightia viridiflora

Loganiaceae

Species

Anthocleista microphylla
Anthocleista scandens
Geniostoma umbellatum
Neuburgia tubiflora
Strychnos benthami
Strychnos elaeocarpa
Strychnos millepunctata
Strychnos staudtii

Varieties
Geniostoma rupestre var. rouffaeranum

Asclepiadaceae

Belostemma yunnanense
Biondia chinensis
Brachystelma omissum
Ceropegia rhynchantha
Cosmostigma hainanense
Cryptolepis macrophylla
Cryptolepis socotrana
Cynanchum anderssonii
Cynanchum bifidum
Cynanchum chimboracense
Cynanchum ellemannii
Cynanchum erikseniae
Cynanchum fasciculiflorum
Cynanchum harlingii
Cynanchum longecalicinum
Cynanchum nielsenii
Cynanchum quitense
Cynanchum stenospira
Cynanchum taihangense
Ditassa anderssonii
Dolichopetalum kwangsiense
Echidnopsis bentii
Echidnopsis inconspicua
Echidnopsis insularis
Echidnopsis milleri
Echidnopsis socotrana
Gonolobus saraguranus
Hoya pandurata
Marsdenia magniflora
Marsdenia robusta, synonym of Dregea arabica
Matelea harlingii
Matelea pastazana
Matelea porphyrocephala
Pentarrhinum ledermannii
Secamone cuneifolia
Secamone letouzeana
Secamone racemosa
Socotrella dolichocnema
Tylophora urceolata, synonym of Vincetoxicum anomalum
Vincetoxicum pannonicum

Gentianaceae

Centaurium somedanum
Exacum caeruleum
Gentianella bohemica
Gentianella crassulifolia
Gentianella fastigiata
Gentianella gilioides
Gentianella hypericoides
Gentianella hyssopifolia
Gentianella oellgaardii
Gentianella profusa
Gentianella saxifragoides
Gentianella sulphurea
Macrocarpaea harlingii
Macrocarpaea thamnoides

Rosales
There are 118 species, 13 subspecies, and nine varieties in the order Rosales assessed as vulnerable.

Chrysobalanaceae

Species

Atuna cordata
Atuna elliptica
Atuna penangiana
Bafodeya benna
Couepia recurva
Couepia schottii
Dactyladenia dinklagei
Hunga gerontogea
Hunga guillauminii
Hunga mackeeana
Licania conferruminata
Licania grandibracteata
Licania hedbergii
Licania vasquezii
Maranthes sanagensis
Parinari argenteo-sericea

Subspecies
Hirtella zanzibarica subsp. megacarpa
Parinari papuana subsp. salomonense
Varieties

Licania intrapetiolaris var. brevis
Magnistipula butayei var. greenwayi
Magnistipula butayei var. sargosii

Connaraceae

Species

Connarus agamae
Jollydora glandulosa
Jollydora pierrei

Varieties
Connarus williamsii var. williamsii
Ellipanthus beccarii var. beccarii

Brunelliaceae

Brunellia acostae
Brunellia antioquensis
Brunellia boqueronensis
Brunellia cayambensis
Brunellia macrophylla
Brunellia occidentalis
Brunellia racemifera
Brunellia subsessilis

Pittosporaceae

Species

Pittosporum artense
Pittosporum collinum
Pittosporum dallii, Dalls pittosporum
Pittosporum fairchildii, Fairchild's kohuhu
Pittosporum gatopense
Pittosporum goetzei
Pittosporum linearifolium
Pittosporum orohenense
Pittosporum paniense
Pittosporum pauciflorum
Pittosporum silamense
Pittosporum terminalioides

Subspecies
Pittosporum senacia subsp. wrightii

Cunoniaceae

Species

Ceratopetalum succirubrum
Cunonia aoupiniensis
Geissois superba
Weinmannia apurimacensis
Weinmannia descendens
Weinmannia jelskii
Weinmannia loxensis
Weinmannia ouaiemensis
Weinmannia portlandiana
Weinmannia stenocarpa
Weinmannia ulei
Weinmannia vitiensis

Varieties

Weinmannia auriculata var. dryadifolia
Weinmannia laurina var. pseudolaurina
Weinmannia microphylla var. tenuior

Rosaceae

Species

Amygdalus bucharica
Aphanes cotopaxiensis
Bencomia exstipulata
Chamaemeles coriacea
Cliffortia arborea
Dendriopoterium pulidoi
Kageneckia lanceolata
Lachemilla aequatoriensis, synonym of Alchemilla aequatoriensis
Lachemilla angustata
Lachemilla jamesonii, synonym of Alchemilla jamesonii
Lachemilla rupestris, synonym of Alchemilla rupestris
Lachemilla sprucei, synonym of Alchemilla sprucei
Malus sieversii
Photinia lasiogyna
Photinia lasiopetala
Polylepis crista-galli
Polylepis hieronymi
Polylepis incana
Polylepis lanuginosa
Polylepis microphylla
Polylepis multijuga
Polylepis neglecta
Polylepis pauta
Polylepis pepei
Polylepis racemosa
Polylepis reticulata
Polylepis rugulosa
Polylepis subsericans
Polylepis weberbaueri
Potentilla delphinensis
Prunus africana, Red stinkwood
Prunus korshinskyi
Prunus laxinervis
Prunus mirabilis
Prunus ramburii
Prunus subglabra
Prunus walkeri
Pyrus complexa, Mixed pear
Pyrus serikensis
Rosa zangezura, Zangezurian rose
Rubus azuayensis
Rubus laegaardii
Sorbus amabilis
Sorbus anglica, English whitebeam
Sorbus arranensis, Arran whitebeam
Sorbus badensis
Sorbus eminens, Round-leaved whitebeam
Sorbus franconica
Sorbus heilingensis
Sorbus pseudofennica, Arran service-tree
Sorbus pseudothuringiaca
Sorbus subcordata
Sorbus subcuneata, Somerset whitebeam
Sorbus vexans, Bloody whitebeam

Subspecies

Lyonothamnus floribundus subsp. asplenifolius, Santa Cruz Island ironwood
Lyonothamnus floribundus subsp. floribundus, Catalina ironwood
Polylepis besseri subsp. besseri
Polylepis besseri subsp. incarum
Polylepis besseri subsp. subtusalbida
Polylepis racemosa subsp. lanata
Polylepis racemosa subsp. triacontandra
Polylepis tomentella subsp. incanoides
Prunus lusitanica subsp. hixa

Varieties
Prunus grisea var. tomentosa

Saxifragaceae

Saxifraga berica
Saxifraga osloensis
Saxifraga portosanctana

Crassulaceae

Aeonium balsamiferum
Aeonium saundersii
Kalanchoe robusta
Sedum brissemoretii
Sempervivum charadzeae, Kharadze's houseleek

Other Rosales

Species

Cephalotus follicularis, Australian pitcher plant
Ribes austroecuadorense
Ribes lehmannii

Subspecies
Brexia madagascariensis subsp. microcarpa

Primulales
There are 50 species and one variety in Primulales assessed as vulnerable.

Myrsinaceae

Ardisia alstonii
Ardisia carchiana
Ardisia flavida
Ardisia furfuracella
Ardisia jamaicensis
Ardisia jefeana
Ardisia martinensis
Ardisia panamensis
Ardisia premontana
Ardisia squamulosa
Ardisia subsessilifolia
Ardisia urbanii
Ardisia websteri
Ardisia zakii
Cybianthus cogolloi
Elingamita johnsonii
Embelia upembensis
Geissanthus challuayacus
Geissanthus ecuadorensis
Heberdenia excelsa
Myrsine bullata
Myrsine degeneri
Myrsine diazii
Myrsine fosbergii
Myrsine hosakae
Myrsine oliveri
Myrsine pearcei
Myrsine reynelii
Myrsine rivularis
Myrsine sodiroana
Parathesis amplifolia
Parathesis aurantica
Parathesis congesta
Parathesis palaciosii
Pleiomeris canariensis
Rapanea coclensis
Rapanea gilliana
Tapeinosperma campanula
Wallenia elliptica
Wallenia erythrocarpa
Wallenia fawcettii
Wallenia sylvestris
Wallenia xylosteoides

Theophrastaceae

Species

Clavija jelskii
Clavija pungens
Clavija repanda
Clavija subandina
Jacquinia proctorii, Wash wood

Varieties
Jacquinia macrantha var. macrantha

Primulaceae
Primula apennina
Soldanella villosa

Rhamnales

Species

Alphitonia erubescens
Alphitonia ponderosa
Auerodendron jamaicense
Cayratia pedata
Colubrina anomala
Colubrina obscura
Emmenosperma pancherianum
Lasiodiscus rozeirae
Rhamnella gilgitica
Rhamnus integrifolia
Ziziphus celata, Florida ziziphus
Ziziphus hutchinsonii
Ziziphus talanai

Subspecies
Lasiodiscus mildbraedii subsp. ferrugineus

Urticales
There are 46 species, five subspecies, and three varieties in Urticales assessed as vulnerable.

Urticaceae

Species

Neraudia melastomifolia
Pilea myriophylla
Pilea napoana
Pilea schimpfii
Pipturus schaeferi

Varieties
Pipturus argenteus var. argenteus

Ulmaceae

Celtis balansae
Celtis lindheimeri, Lindheimer hackberry
Celtis luzonica
Phyllostylon orthopterum
Ulmus elongata
Ulmus wallichiana

Cecropiaceae

Species

Cecropia maxima
Cecropia tubulosa
Cecropia utcubambana
Cecropia velutinella
Coussapoa curranii
Coussapoa floccosa
Pourouma oraria

Subspecies
Pourouma hirsutipetiolata subsp. hirsutipetiolata
Pourouma melinonii subsp. glabrata

Moraceae

Species

Artocarpus blancoi
Artocarpus hypargyreus
Artocarpus nobilis
Artocarpus rubrovenus
Artocarpus treculianus
Dorstenia holstii
Dorstenia prorepens
Dorstenia socotrana
Dorstenia tenuiradiata
Dorstenia ulugurensis
Dorstenia zambesiaca
Ficus aguaraguensis
Ficus bizanae
Ficus bojeri
Ficus calyptroceras
Ficus faulkneriana
Ficus lacunata
Ficus lapathifolia
Ficus mexiae
Ficus mutabilis
Ficus pakkensis
Ficus pulchella
Ficus ulmifolia
Milicia regia
Naucleopsis chiguila
Naucleopsis oblongifolia
Sorocea guilleminiana
Streblus sclerophyllus

Subspecies

Brosimum utile subsp. darienense, Cow tree
Ficus chlamydocarpa subsp. fernandesiana
Ficus reflexa subsp. sechellensis

Varieties
Dorstenia holstii var. longistipulata
Dorstenia tayloriana var. tayloriana

Cornales

Species

Alangium circulare
Alangium havilandii
Alangium longiflorum
Cornus disciflora
Cornus monbeigii
Diplopanax stachyanthus
Mastixia glauca
Mastixia macrocarpa
Mastixia macrophylla
Mastixia nimali
Mastixia tetrandra
Melanophylla madagascariensis

Varieties
Davidia involucrata var. vilmoriniana

Solanales
There are 33 species and two subspecies in the order Solanales assessed as vulnerable.

Solanaceae

Species

Brunfelsia jamaicensis
Brunfelsia membranacea
Brunfelsia splendida
Deprea ecuatoriana
Iochroma lehmannii
Iochroma longipes
Larnax andersonii
Larnax psilophyta
Lycianthes hypochrysea
Markea epifita
Markea spruceana
Sessea sodiroi
Solanum asteropilodes
Solanum chilliasense
Solanum exiguum
Solanum fortunense
Solanum hypermegethes
Solanum imbaburense
Solanum interandinum
Solanum leiophyllum
Solanum regularifolium
Solanum roseum
Solanum sibundoyense
Trianaea naeka

Subspecies
Solanum circinatum subsp. ramosa
Solanum corymbiflora subsp. mortoniana

Convolvulaceae

Convolvulus fernandesii
Convolvulus massonii
Ipomoea chrysocalyx
Ipomoea pulcherrima
Metaporana obtusa
Seddera fastigiata
Seddera semhahensis
Seddera spinosa

Menyanthaceae
Villarsia goldblattiana

Scrophulariales
There are 220 species, 14 subspecies, and two varieties in the order Scrophulariales assessed as vulnerable.

Globulariaceae
Globularia sarcophylla
Globularia stygia

Oleaceae

Species

Chionanthus avilensis
Chionanthus jamaicensis
Chionanthus micranthus
Chionanthus richardsiae
Chionanthus spiciferus
Chionanthus wurdackii
Jasminum elatum
Jasminum noumeense
Olea chimanimani
Picconia excelsa

Subspecies
Fraxinus caroliniana subsp. cubensis
Varieties
Chionanthus caymanensis var. caymanensis

Buddlejaceae

Buddleja jamesonii
Buddleja lanata
Buddleja lojensis

Gesneriaceae

Species

Alloplectus martinianus
Alloplectus penduliflorus
Columnea albiflora
Columnea brenneri
Columnea capillosa
Columnea elongatifolia
Columnea eubracteata
Columnea katzensteinii
Columnea mastersonii
Columnea ovatifolia
Columnea rileyi
Columnea rubribracteata
Cremosperma ecudoranum
Cremosperma reldioides
Cyrtandra denhamii
Cyrtandra elbertii
Cyrtandra kandavuensis
Cyrtandra natewaensis
Cyrtandra spathacea
Cyrtandra tavinunensis
Cyrtandra tempestii
Damrongia cyanantha
Diastema gymnoleuca
Drymonia chiribogana
Drymonia crenatiloba
Drymonia pulchra
Drymonia punctulata
Gasteranthus imbaburensis
Gasteranthus lateralis
Gasteranthus otongensis
Gasteranthus trifoliatus
Monopyle ecuadorensis
Nautilocalyx glandulifer
Nodonema lineatum
Paraboea acaulis
Paraboea glandulifera
Paraboea vulpina
Paradrymonia aurea
Paradrymonia fuquaiana
Pearcea cordata
Pearcea glabrata
Petrocosmea bicolor
Petrocosmea pubescens
Phinaea ecuadorana
Reldia multiflora
Saintpaulia pusilla
Streptocarpus compressus
Streptocarpus holstii
Streptocarpus kungwensis
Streptocarpus parensis
Streptocarpus schliebenii

Subspecies

Saintpaulia ionantha subsp. grotei
Saintpaulia ionantha subsp. ionantha
Saintpaulia ionantha subsp. mafiensis
Saintpaulia ionantha subsp. occidentalis
Saintpaulia ionantha subsp. pendula

Varieties
Rhytidophyllum grande var. laevigatum

Bignoniaceae

Amphitecna isthmica
Amphitecna sessilifolia
Catalpa brevipes
Fernandoa ferdinandi
Jacaranda arborea
Jacaranda mimosifolia
Parmentiera stenocarpa
Romeroa verticillata
Spirotecoma apiculata
Tabebuia anafensis
Tabebuia arimaoensis
Tabebuia bibracteolata
Tabebuia dubia
Tabebuia furfuracea
Tabebuia hypoleuca
Tabebuia jackiana
Tabebuia lapacho
Tabebuia oligolepis
Tabebuia palustris
Tabebuia polymorpha
Tabebuia shaferi
Tabebuia striata
Zeyheria tuberculosa

Acanthaceae

Species

Acanthopale decempedalis
Acanthus kulalensis
Acanthus latisepalus
Afrofittonia silvestris
Anisotes galanae
Aphelandra albinotata
Aphelandra anderssonii
Aphelandra attenuata
Aphelandra chrysantha
Aphelandra dodsonii
Aphelandra gunnari
Aphelandra zamorensis
Asystasia glandulifera
Asystasia lindauiana
Asystasia minutiflora
Barleria aenea
Barleria athiensis
Barleria bornuensis
Barleria griseoviridis
Barleria lukwangulensis
Barleria maritima
Barleria mpandensis
Barleria rhynchocarpa
Barleria richardsiae
Barleria scandens
Barleria splendens
Barleria subregularis
Barleria tetracantha
Blepharis chrysotricha
Blepharis dhofarensis
Blepharis petraea
Blepharis pratensis
Blepharis spiculifolia
Blepharis turkanae
Blepharis uzondoensis
Brachystephanus giganteus
Brachystephanus glaberrimus
Brachystephanus longiflorus
Brachystephanus oreacanthus
Brillantaisia lancifolia
Chorisochora minor
Chorisochora striata
Crossandra friesiorum
Dicliptera alternans
Dicliptera inconspicua
Dicliptera latibracteata
Dicliptera nilotica
Dicliptera pilosa
Dicliptera silvestris
Duosperma dichotomum
Duosperma livingstoniense
Duosperma subquadrangulare
Dyschoriste sallyae
Dyschoriste subquadrangularis
Ecbolium tanzaniense
Echinacanthus lofuensis
Echinacanthus longipes
Eranthemum austrosinensis
Gymnostachyum kwangsiense
Hypoestes potamophila
Isoglossa dispersa
Isoglossa mbalensis
Isoglossa nervosa
Isoglossa ufipensis
Justicia alexandri
Justicia alterniflora
Justicia attenuifolia
Justicia brevipila
Justicia camerunensis
Justicia chalaensis
Justicia galeata
Justicia gilbertii
Justicia heterotricha
Justicia kiborianensis
Justicia kulalensis
Justicia lukei
Justicia migeodii
Justicia orbicularis
Justicia riopalenquensis
Justicia rodgersii
Justicia sulphuriflora
Justicia tigrina
Justicia ukagurensis
Lepidagathis perrieri
Mimulopsis volleseniana
Neriacanthus harlingii
Neuracanthus ukambensis
Nilgirianthus ciliatus
Podorungia clandestina
Podorungia humblotii
Pseuderanthemum campylosiphon
Pseuderanthemum dispersum
Pseuderanthemum incisum
Ruellia kuriensis
Ruellia paulayana
Staurogyne bicolor
Stenandrium gabonicum
Stenandrium harlingii
Stenostephanus lugonis
Stenostephanus luteynii
Whitfieldia preussii

Subspecies

Barleria mpandensis subsp. mpandensis
Barleria mpandensis subsp. tomentella
Brachystephanus coeruleus subsp. apiculatus
Brachystephanus coeruleus subsp. coeruleus
Brachystephanus jaundensis subsp. nimbae
Dyschoriste keniensis subsp. glandulifera
Isoglossa substrobilina subsp. tenuispicata
Staurogyne kamerunensis subsp. calabarensis

Scrophulariaceae

Bartsia alba
Bartsia pumila
Calceolaria adenanthera
Calceolaria brachiata
Calceolaria dilatata
Calceolaria harlingii
Calceolaria lanata
Calceolaria oxyphylla
Calceolaria pedunculata
Calceolaria serrata
Calceolaria spruceana
Calceolaria stricta
Calceolaria zamorana
Castilleja ecuadorensis
Cromidon pusillum
Euphrasia marchesettii
Galvezia lanceolata
Graderia fruticosa
Veronica barkeri, Barker's koromiko
Linaria pseudolaxiflora, Maltese toadflax
Nanorrhinum kuriense
Rhabdotosperma ledermannii
Scrophularia olgae, Olga's fig-wort
Verbascum litigiosum
Veronica micrantha

Lentibulariaceae

Genlisea barthlottii
Pinguicula fontiqueriana
Pinguicula mundi
Utricularia albocaerulea
Utricularia wightiana

Lamiales
There are 111 species, two subspecies, and four varieties in the order Lamiales assessed as vulnerable.

Verbenaceae

Species

Aegiphila fasciculata
Aegiphila monstrosa
Aegiphila panamensis
Aegiphila purpurascens
Aegiphila rimbachii
Aegiphila skutchii
Citharexylum gentryi
Citharexylum grandiflorum
Citharexylum lojense
Citharexylum quereifolium
Citharexylum rimbachii
Citharexylum suberosum
Citharexylum ternatum
Clerodendrum anomalum
Clerodendrum calcicola
Clerodendrum denticulatum
Clerodendrum galeatum
Clerodendrum leucophloeum
Clerodendrum lutambense
Coelocarpum haggierensis
Gmelina hainanensis
Lantana pastazensis
Lippia salicifolia
Oxera cauliflora
Oxera macrocalyx
Oxera nuda
Premna grandifolia
Premna hans-joachimii
Premna maxima
Premna schliebenii
Premna szemaoensis
Premna tanganyikensis
Rhaphithamnus venustus
Stachytarpheta steyermarkii
Vitex acunae
Vitex ajugaeflora
Vitex amaniensis
Vitex keniensis, Meru oak
Vitex parviflora
Vitex urceolata
Vitex zanzibarensis

Varieties

Aegiphila cuneata var. hirsutissima
Clerodendrum glabrum var. minutiflorum
Vitex ferruginea var. amaniensis

Labiatae

Species

Lepechinia mutica
Lepechinia paniculata
Lepechinia rufocampii
Leucas flagellifolia
Leucas hagghierensis
Leucas penduliflora
Leucas samhaensis
Origanum cordifolium
Origanum ehrenbergii, Ehrenberg's marjoram
Orthosiphon ferrugineus
Platostoma fastigiatum
Platostoma thymifolium
Plectranthus bipinnatus
Plectranthus cataractarum
Plectranthus trullatus
Plectranthus unguentarius
Salvia austromelissodora
Salvia curticalyx
Salvia flocculosa
Salvia leucocephala
Salvia trachyphylla
Scutellaria alborosea
Scutellaria sarmentosa
Sideritis cypria
Sideritis infernalis
Sideritis javalambrensis
Stachys sprucei
Stachys trichophylla
Teucrium turredanum
Thymus markhotensis, Markhotian thyme
Tinnea vesiculosa

Subspecies
Plectranthus punctatus subsp. lanatus
Stachys pseudohumifusa subsp. saxeri

Boraginaceae

Species

Cordia anisophylla
Cordia cicatricosa
Cordia croatii
Cordia harrisii
Cordia mandimbana
Cordia mukuensis
Cordia platythyrsa
Cordia ramirezii
Cordia stuhlmannii
Cordia troyana
Cordia valenzuelana
Cynoglossum imeretinum, Imeretian hound's-tongue
Echiochilon pulvinata
Echium callithyrsum
Echium gentianoides
Ehretia scrobiculata
Heliotropium aff. wagneri
Heliotropium anderssonii
Heliotropium argenteum
Heliotropium dentatum
Heliotropium kuriense
Heliotropium nigricans
Heliotropium paulayanum
Heliotropium riebeckii
Heliotropium wagneri
Myosotis azorica
Omphalodes kusnetzovii, Kuznetsov's navelwort
Omphalodes kuzinskyanae
Rochefortia acrantha
Symphytum cycladense
Tiquilia nesiotica
Tournefortia rufo-sericea, Rufous-haired tournefortia
Trichodesma scotti
Varronia clarendonensis
Wellstedia socotrana

Varieties
Cordia sebestena var. caymanensis

Avicenniaceae

Avicennia bicolor
Avicennia integra
Avicennia lanata
Avicennia rumphiana

Juglandales

Alfaroa hondurensis
Alfaroa mexicana
Engelhardtia danumensis
Engelhardtia kinabaluensis
Engelhardtia mendalomensis
Juglans californica, Northern California black walnut
Juglans insularis
Juglans jamaicensis, West Indian walnut
Rhoiptelea chiliantha

Nepenthales
There are 41 species in Nepenthales assessed as vulnerable.

Nepenthaceae

Nepenthes argentii
Nepenthes bicalcarata
Nepenthes bongso
Nepenthes campanulata, Bell-shaped pitcher-plant
Nepenthes danseri
Nepenthes distillatoria
Nepenthes edwardsiana
Nepenthes ephippiata
Nepenthes eymae
Nepenthes faizaliana
Nepenthes fallax
Nepenthes fusca
Nepenthes gantungensis
Nepenthes glabrata
Nepenthes hamata
Nepenthes inermis
Nepenthes insignis
Nepenthes lowii
Nepenthes macfarlanei
Nepenthes macrovulgaris
Nepenthes madagascariensis
Nepenthes merrilliana
Nepenthes mikei
Nepenthes mira
Nepenthes muluensis
Nepenthes naga
Nepenthes northiana
Nepenthes ovata
Nepenthes pervillei
Nepenthes pitopangii
Nepenthes ramispina
Nepenthes rhombicaulis
Nepenthes sibuyanensis
Nepenthes singalana
Nepenthes spathulata
Nepenthes spectabilis
Nepenthes tomoriana
Nepenthes villosa

Droseraceae
Dionaea muscipula, Venus flytrap
Drosera bequaertii

Sarraceniaceae
Sarracenia leucophylla

Hamamelidales

Species

Chunia bucklandioides
Embolanthera spicata
Loropetalum subcordatum
Maingaya malayana
Matudaea trinervia
Platanus kerrii
Trichocladus goetzei

Varieties
Liquidambar orientalis var. integriloba
Liquidambar orientalis var. orientalis

Dilleniales

Dillenia fischeri
Dillenia luzoniensis
Dillenia megalantha
Dillenia philippinensis
Dillenia reifferscheidtia
Hibbertia emarginata
Hibbertia heterotricha
Hibbertia moratii
Hibbertia rubescens

Ranunculales
There are 36 species, one subspecies, and one variety in the order Ranunculales assessed as vulnerable.

Meliosmaceae
Meliosma sirensis
Meliosma youngii

Berberidaceae

Berberis candidula
Berberis dryandriphylla
Berberis iliensis
Berberis johannis
Berberis pindilicensis
Berberis silvicola
Berberis taronensis
Berberis woomungensis
Berberis xanthophloea
Dysosma aurantiocaulis
Dysosma tsayuensis
Dysosma veitchii
Dysosma versipellis
Epimedium ecalcaratum
Epimedium flavum
Epimedium parvifolium
Epimedium simplicifolium
Epimedium truncatum
Epimedium zhushanense
Mahonia conferta
Mahonia decipiens
Mahonia microphylla
Mahonia oiwakensis

Menispermaceae

Species

Albertisia capituliflora
Albertisia glabra
Cissampelos nigrescens
Disciphania tricaudata
Hyperbaena allenii
Hyperbaena jalcomulcensis

Subspecies
Anisocycla blepharosepala subsp. tanzaniensis
Varieties
Cissampelos nigrescens var. nigrescens

Ranunculaceae

Aconitum corsicum
Aconitum violaceum
Ranunculus kykkoensis
Ranunculus schweinfurthii
Ranunculus weyleri

Ericales
There are 17 species and one variety in the order Ericales assessed as vulnerable.

Clethraceae
Clethra javanica
Clethra parallelinervia

Ericaceae

Species

Arbutus canariensis
Arbutus pavarii
Arctostaphylos catalinae
Craibiodendron scleranthum
Diplycosia pilosa
Gaultheria nubigena
Macleania loeseneriana
Philippia nyassana
Rhododendron album
Rhododendron cyanocarpum
Rhododendron jucundum, syn. of Rhododendron selense subsp. jucundum
Rhododendron loerzingii
Rhododendron subansiriense
Rhododendron wattii
Vaccinium bissei

Varieties
Rhododendron dalhousiae var. rhabdotum

Polygonales

Species

Calligonum paletzkianum
Coccoloba coriacea
Coccoloba matudae
Coccoloba tiliacea
Coccoloba troyana
Fallopia koreana
Rumex andinus
Rumex rupestris, Shore dock

Varieties
Triplaris setosa var. woytkowskii

Podostemales

Apinagia boliviana
Castelnavia monandra
Castelnavia noveloi
Dalzellia ranongensis
Diamantina lombardii
Farmeria metzgerioides
Hanseniella heterophylla
Ledermanniella aloides
Ledermanniella bifurcata
Ledermanniella boumiensis
Ledermanniella cristata
Ledermanniella kamerunensis
Ledermanniella schlechteri
Ledermanniella warmingiana
Macropodiella hallaei
Macropodiella heteromorpha
Podostemum saldanhanum
Polypleurum filifolium
Rhyncholacis nobilis
Saxicolella laciniata
Saxicolella nana
Willisia selaginoides

Fabales

Species

Abarema abbottii
Abarema bigemina
Abarema callejasii
Abarema centiflora
Abarema filamentosa
Abarema ganymedea
Abarema josephi
Abarema killipii
Abarema lehmannii
Abarema obovata
Abarema oxyphyllidia
Abarema racemiflora
Abarema turbinata
Acacia albicorticata
Acacia ankokib
Acacia campbellii
Acacia crassicarpa
Acacia densispina
Acacia etilis
Acacia ferruginea
Acacia flagellaris
Acacia koaia
Acacia latispina
Acacia manubensis
Acacia octonervia
Acacia prasinata
Acacia pseudonigrescens
Acacia purpurea
Acacia venosa
Acacia villosa
Adenanthera bicolor
Adenanthera intermedia
Adenopodia rotundifolia
Adesmia cordobensis
Aeschynomene schindleri
Afzelia africana, Afzelia
Afzelia bipindensis
Afzelia pachyloba, White afzelia
Afzelia rhomboidea
Albizia berteriana
Albizia buntingii
Albizia burkartiana
Albizia carrii
Albizia edwarllii
Albizia ferruginea, Albizia
Albizia guillainii
Albizia leonardii
Albizia obbiadensis
Almaleea capitata, Slender parrot-pea
Amburana acreana
Amorpha ouachitensis, Ouachita false indigo
Andira galeottiana
Angylocalyx braunii
Angylocalyx talbotii
Anthonotha lebrunii
Anthonotha nigerica
Anthonotha obanensis
Anthonotha vignei
Arachis cruziana
Arapatiella psilophylla
Archidendron forbesii
Archidendron oblongum
Archidendropsis glandulosa
Archidendropsis lentiscifolia
Archidendropsis paivana
Astracantha atenica, Atenian astracantha
Astragalus aspindzicus, Aspindzian astragalus
Astragalus hirtulus
Astragalus holophyllus, Entire-leaved milk vetch
Astragalus leucolobus, Big bear Valley woollypod
Astragalus setosulus
Astragalus shagalensis, Shagalian milk vetch
Astragalus sprucei
Astragalus tanaiticus
Ateleia salicifolia
Baphia abyssinica
Baphia breteleriana
Baphia dewildeana
Baphia heudelotiana
Baphia keniensis
Baphia kirkii
Baphia latiloi
Baphia macrocalyx
Baphia semseiana
Bauhinia augusti
Bauhinia bowkeri
Bauhinia loeseneriana
Bauhinia pichinchensis
Belairia parvifolia
Berlinia occidentalis
Berlinia orientalis
Bossiaea oxyclada
Brachystegia bakeriana
Brachystegia kennedyi
Brachystegia nigerica
Browneopsis excelsa
Bussea xylocarpa
Cadia pedicellata
Caesalpinia nhatrangense
Caesalpinia paraguariensis
Calliandra comosa
Calliandra decrescens
Calliandra paniculata
Calliandra pilosa
Calliandra tumbeziana
Calpocalyx atlanticus
Calpocalyx brevifolius
Calpocalyx cauliflorus
Calpocalyx heitzii
Calpocalyx klainei
Calpocalyx letestui
Calpocalyx ngouiensis
Canavalia hawaiiensis, Hawaiian jackbean
Cassia aldabrensis
Cassia aubrevillei
Centrolobium yavizanum
Chadsia magnifica
Chamaecrista bucherae
Chamaecrista caribaea
Chamaecrista lomatopoda
Chamaecrista onusta
Chloroleucon chacoense
Chloroleucon eurycyclum
Chloroleucon extortum
Chordospartium stevensonii, Weeping tree broom
Clitoria moyobambensis
Clitoria woytkowskii
Copaifera epunctata
Copaifera panamensis
Copaifera salikounda
Cordeauxia edulis
Cordyla densiflora
Cordyla haraka
Cordyla richardii
Coursetia brachyrachis
Coursetia gracilis
Coursetia hypoleuca
Craibia atlantica
Cratylia bahiensis
Crotalaria exilipes
Crotalaria jacksonii
Crotalaria ledermannii
Crotalaria schliebenii
Crotalaria socotrana
Crudia balachandrae
Crudia brevipes
Crudia lanceolata
Crudia penduliflora
Crudia scortechinii
Crudia splendens
Cryptosepalum tetraphyllum
Cyclopia bolusii
Cynometra brachyrrhachis
Cynometra engleri
Cynometra inaequifolia
Cynometra longipedicellata
Cynometra suaheliensis
Cynometra webberi
Dalbergia acariiantha
Dalbergia aurea
Dalbergia balansae
Dalbergia baronii
Dalbergia catipenonii
Dalbergia chlorocarpa
Dalbergia cochinchinensis, Siamese rosewood
Dalbergia glaberrima
Dalbergia glomerata
Dalbergia hildebrandtii
Dalbergia latifolia, Bombay blackwood
Dalbergia lemurica
Dalbergia madagascariensis
Dalbergia monticola
Dalbergia neoperrieri
Dalbergia nigra, Bahia rosewood
Dalbergia odorifera
Dalbergia orientalis
Dalbergia pseudobaronii
Dalbergia purpurascens
Dalbergia retusa
Dalbergia simpsonii
Dalbergia tonkinensis
Dalbergia tricolor
Dalbergia vacciniifolia
Dalbergia viguieri
Dalea jamesonii
Daniellia oblonga
Delonix decaryi
Dialium holtzii
Dichrostachys dehiscens
Dicraeopetalum capuroniana
Dicraeopetalum mahafaliensis
Dicraeopetalum stipulare
Dipteryx alata
Dipteryx charapilla
Dussia foxii
Eleiotis rottleri
Englerodendron usambarense
Eriosema letouzeyi
Erythrina elenae
Erythrina euodiphylla
Erythrina haerdii
Erythrina hazomboay
Erythrina polychaeta
Erythrina tuxtlana
Eurypetalum unijugum
Fordia incredibilis
Fordia lanceolata
Fordia ophirensis
Fordia pauciflora
Genista benehoavensis
Genista tetragona
Gilbertiodendron bilineatum
Gilbertiodendron klainei
Gilbertiodendron pachyanthum
Gilbertiodendron robynsianum
Gilbertiodendron splendidum
Gilletiodendron glandulosum
Gleditsia assamica
Gossweilerodendron joveri
Guibourtia schliebenii
Hammatolobium kremerianum
Haplormosia monophylla
Harpalyce maisiana
Humboldtia laurifolia
Hymenaea torrei
Hymenostegia bakeriana
Indigofera dasycephala
Indigofera imerinensis
Indigofera rothii
Indigofera sokotrana
Inga allenii
Inga amboroensis
Inga andersonii
Inga approximata
Inga aptera
Inga augusti
Inga balsapambensis
Inga bicoloriflora
Inga bijuga
Inga bollandii
Inga bullata
Inga bullatorugosa
Inga calantha
Inga calanthoides
Inga calcicola
Inga canonegrensis
Inga caudata
Inga chiapensis
Inga coragypsea
Inga cuspidata
Inga cynometrifolia
Inga dominicensis
Inga dwyeri
Inga exilis
Inga extra-nodis
Inga fosteriana
Inga gereauana
Inga grazielae
Inga hispida
Inga interfluminensis
Inga ismaelis
Inga lenticellata
Inga lentiscifolia
Inga leptantha
Inga leptingoides
Inga macarenensis
Inga macrantha
Inga martinicensis
Inga microcalyx
Inga mucuna
Inga neblinensis
Inga pallida
Inga pauciflora
Inga pleiogyna
Inga pluricarpellata
Inga portobellensis
Inga praegnans
Inga saffordiana
Inga salicifoliola
Inga saltensis
Inga santaremnensis
Inga silanchensis
Inga skutchii
Inga spiralis
Inga suborbicularis
Inga tenuicalyx
Inga unica
Inga xinguensis
Inga yasuniana
Intsia acuminata
Intsia bijuga, Borneo teak
Isoberlinia scheffleri
Jacqueshuberia loretensis
Julbernardia magnistipulata
Kalappia celebica
Koompassia grandiflora
Kotschya micrantha
Kotschya platyphylla
Lecointea ovalifolia
Lennea viridiflora
Leptoderris aurantiaca
Leucaena cuspidata
Leucaena greggii
Leucaena lempirana
Leucaena pueblana
Leucochloron foederale
Leucostegane latistipulata
Loesenera kalantha
Loesenera talbotii
Lonchocarpus calcaratus
Lonchocarpus chiricanus
Lonchocarpus santarosanus
Lotononis rigida
Lotus mollis
Lupinus macbrideanus
Machaerium chambersii
Machaerium cuzcoense
Machaerium glabripes
Machaerium villosum
Macrolobium amplexans
Macrolobium stenopetalum
Macrolobium taylorii
Macrosamanea macrocalyx
Macrosamanea prancei
Medicago kotovii
Michelsonia microphylla
Micklethwaitia carvalhoi
Microberlinia brazzavillensis, Zebrawood
Millettia bussei
Millettia capuronii
Millettia decipiens
Millettia elongatistyla
Millettia eriocarpa
Millettia galliflagrans
Millettia lacus-alberti
Millettia limbutuensis
Millettia pilosa
Millettia pterocarpa
Millettia sacleuxii
Millettia schliebenii
Millettia semseii
Millettia sericantha
Millettia unifoliata
Millettia warneckei
Mimosa andina
Mimosa caesalpiniaefolia
Mimosa domingensis
Mimosa nothacacia
Monopetalanthus compactus
Monopetalanthus durandii
Mora ekmanii
Mora oleifera
Neoharmsia madagascariensis
Newtonia paucijuga
Ormocarpopsis mandrarensis
Ormocarpopsis parvifolia
Ormocarpum dhofarense
Ormosia grandistipulata
Ormosia polita
Oxystigma msoo
Paramachaerium schunkei
Parkia korom
Parkia parvifoliola
Pericopsis mooniana, Nandu wood
Phylloxylon xylophylloides
Piptadenia weberbaueri
Pithecellobium gracile
Pithecellobium grisebachianum
Pithecellobium pithecolobioides
Pithecellobium savannarum
Plathymenia foliolosa
Platymiscium gracile
Platysepalum inopinatum
Poecilanthe ovalifolia
Pongamia velutina
Pongamiopsis viguieri
Prosopis abbreviata
Pseudosamanea cubana
Pseudovigna sulaensis
Pterocarpus indicus, Amboyna wood
Pterocarpus marsupium, East Indian/Malabar kino
Pultenaea brachytropis
Pultenaea pinifolia, Tree pultenaea
Pultenaea whiteana, Mount Barney bush pea
Rhynchosia androyensis
Rhynchosia baukea
Rhynchosia heynei
Saraca asoca
Sclerolobium striatum
Senna domingensis
Senna multifoliolata
Serianthes calycina
Serianthes margaretae
Serianthes vitiensis
Sesbania speciosa
Sindora inermis
Sindora javanica
Sindora supa
Sophora fernandeziana
Sophora masafuerana
Sphaerolobium pubescens
Storckiella vitiensis
Stryphnodendron harbesonii
Stuhlmannia moavi
Swainsona murrayana, Slender darling-pea
Swartzia haughtii
Swartzia rediviva
Swartzia santanderensis
Sylvichadsia grandifolia
Sympetalandra schmutzii
Taverniera sericophylla
Tephrosia genistoides
Tephrosia parvifolia
Tephrosia pondoensis
Tephrosia socotrana
Tetraberlinia tubmaniana
Umtiza listeriana
Vaughania cloiselii
Xanthocercis madagascariensis
Xanthocercis rabiensis
Zenkerella egregia
Zenkerella perplexa
Zygia biflora
Zygia oriunda

Subspecies

Albizia tanganyicensis subsp. adamsoniorum
Astragalus stevenianus subsp. meskheticus, Meskhetian astragalus
Baphia incerta subsp. lebrunii
Baphia leptostemma subsp. leptostemma
Baphia marceliana subsp. marquesii
Baphia punctulata subsp. punctulata
Ceratonia oreothauma subsp. oreothauma
Craibia brevicaudata subsp. schliebenii
Dalbergia albiflora subsp. echinocarpa
Delonix leucantha subsp. bemarahensis
Delonix leucantha subsp. leucantha
Indigofera patula subsp. okuensis
Inga subnuda subsp. subnuda
Kotschya recurvifolia subsp. longifolia
Millettia impressa subsp. goetzeana
Millettia oblata subsp. intermedia
Millettia oblata subsp. oblata
Millettia oblata subsp. stolzii
Millettia oblata subsp. teitensis
Ormocarpum sennoides subsp. zanzibaricum
Pterocarpus mildbraedii subsp. usambarensis, White padouk
Sakoanala villosa subsp. menabeensis
Senna multijuga subsp. doylei
Zenkerella capparidacea subsp. capparidacea
Zenkerella capparidacea subsp. grotei

Varieties

Abarema cochleata var. moniliformis
Abarema curvicarpa var. rodriguesii
Abarema leucophylla var. vaupesensis
Albizia malacophylla var. malacophylla
Albizia multiflora var. sagasteguii
Baphia leptostemma var. conraui
Dalbergia fusca var. enneandra
Geoffroea decorticans var. subtropicalis
Leucaena confertiflora var. confertiflora
Maniltoa schefferi var. peekelii
Millettia usaramensis var. parvifolia
Senna dariensis var. hypoglauca
Serianthes melanesica var. meeboldii
Tessmannia martiniana var. martiniana

Rhizophorales

Anopyxis klaineana
Carallia calycina
Cassipourea fanshawei
Cassipourea flanaganii
Cassipourea hiotou
Cassipourea thomassetii

Caryophyllales
There are 190 species, 12 subspecies, and one variety in the order Caryophyllales assessed as vulnerable.

Caryophyllaceae

Species

Cerastium dinaricum
Cerastium svanicum, Svanetian chickweed
Dianthus hypanicus
Dianthus kubanensis, Kubanian poppy
Gypsophila robusta, Robust chalk plant
Gypsophila szovitsii, Szovits' gypsophila
Moehringia hypanica
Petrocoptis grandiflora
Petrocoptis pseudoviscosa
Polycarpaea hassalensis
Polycarpaea kuriensis
Polycarpaea paulayana
Silene alpicola, Alpine catchfly
Silene hicesiae
Spergularia doumerguei
Spergularia embergeri

Subspecies
Dianthus cintranus subsp. cintranus

Amaranthaceae

Species

Achyranthes splendens, Maui chaff flower
Alternanthera areschougii
Alternanthera corymbiformis
Alternanthera flavicoma
Alternanthera galapagensis
Alternanthera grandis
Alternanthera helleri
Alternanthera snodgrassii
Alternathera subscaposa (as Lithophila subscaposa)
Froelichia juncea
Froelichia nudicaulis
Iresine pedicellata
Pleuropetalum darwinii
Psilotrichum axilliflorum

Subspecies

Alternanthera filifolia subsp. glauca
Alternanthera filifolia subsp. glaucescens
Alternanthera filifolia subsp. microcephala
Alternanthera filifolia subsp. nudicaulis
Alternanthera filifolia subsp. pintensis
Alternanthera filifolia subsp. rabidensis
Froelichia juncea subsp. alata
Froelichia juncea subsp. juncea
Froelichia nudicaulis subsp. curta
Froelichia nudicaulis subsp. lanigera
Froelichia nudicaulis subsp. nudicaulis

Varieties
Achyranthes splendens var. splendens

Nyctaginaceae

Neea darienensis
Pisonia artensis
Pisonia donnellsmithii

Chenopodiaceae

Anabasis eugeniae, Eugenia's anabasis
Beta nana
Chenopodium helenense, St Helena goosefoot
Salicornia veneta, Venice salicorne

Portulacaceae
Portulaca kuriensis

Illecebraceae

Gymnocarpos bracteatus
Gymnocarpos kuriensis
Herniaria algarvica

Cactus species

Acharagma roseanum
Arrojadoa dinae
Arthrocereus melanurus
Astrophytum asterias, Sand dollar cactus
Astrophytum coahuilense
Astrophytum ornatum
Austrocylindropuntia lagopus
Brasilicereus estevesii
Brasilicereus markgrafii
Browningia altissima
Cephalocereus nizandensis
Cephalocereus totolapensis
Cereus fricii
Cereus pierre-braunianus
Cereus vargasianus
Cipocereus bradei
Copiapoa megarhiza
Corryocactus erectus
Coryphantha hintoniorum
Cylindropuntia anteojoensis
Cylindropuntia santamaria
Discocactus bahiensis
Discocactus boliviensis
Discocactus horstii
Disocactus phyllanthoides
Echinocereus mapimiensis
Echinocereus maritimus
Echinocereus pulchellus
Echinopsis albispinosa
Echinopsis ancistrophora
Echinopsis backebergii
Echinopsis chrysantha
Echinopsis famatinensis
Echinopsis terscheckii
Echinopsis thelegona
Echinopsis thelegonoides
Eriosyce confinis
Eriosyce napina
Eriosyce odieri
Eriosyce recondita
Eriosyce rodentiophila
Eriosyce senilis
Eriosyce taltalensis
Escobaria robbinsorum, Cochise pincushion cactus
Espostoopsis dybowskii
Facheiroa cephaliomelana
Ferocactus fordii
Ferocactus herrerae
Ferocactus macrodiscus
Ferocactus robustus
Ferocactus tiburonensis
Ferocactus wislizeni, Fishhook barrel cactus
Frailea gracillima
Frailea phaeodisca
Frailea schilinzkyana
Gymnocalycium marianae
Gymnocalycium paraguayense
Gymnocalycium uruguayense
Hylocereus minutiflorus
Hylocereus stenopterus
Leptocereus paniculatus
Lophophora diffusa
Lophophora williamsii, Peyote
Mammillaria armillata
Mammillaria berkiana
Mammillaria bocensis
Mammillaria bombycina
Mammillaria carretii
Mammillaria deherdtiana
Mammillaria eriacantha
Mammillaria halei
Mammillaria jaliscana
Mammillaria longimamma
Mammillaria luethyi
Mammillaria multidigitata
Mammillaria oteroi
Mammillaria perbella
Mammillaria petrophila
Mammillaria pringlei
Mammillaria schiedeana
Mammillaria tayloriorum
Matucana krahnii
Matucana oreodoxa
Matucana paucicostata
Melocactus pachyacanthus
Melocactus salvadorensis
Melocactus schatzlii
Melocactus violaceus
Micranthocereus albicephalus
Mila caespitosa
Neobuxbaumia euphorbioides
Neobuxbaumia polylopha
Opuntia schumannii
Pachycereus gatesii
Pachycereus grandis
Pachycereus militaris
Parodia alacriportana
Parodia concinna
Parodia fusca
Parodia glaucina
Parodia haselbergii
Parodia langsdorfii
Parodia neoarechavaletae
Parodia ottonis
Parodia oxycostata
Parodia permutata
Parodia schumanniana
Parodia scopa
Parodia turecekiana
Peniocereus castellae
Peniocereus chiapensis
Peniocereus cuixmalensis
Peniocereus fosterianus
Peniocereus oaxacensis
Peniocereus rosei
Peniocereus tepalcatepecanus
Pereskia marcanoi
Pereskia portulacifolia
Pereskia zinniiflora
Pierrebraunia bahiensis
Pilosocereus aureispinus
Pilosocereus parvus
Rhipsalidopsis gaertneri, syn. Schlumbergera gaertneri, Easter cactus
Rhipsalis oblonga
Rhipsalis pilocarpa
Rhipsalis russellii
Schlumbergera microsphaerica
Schlumbergera opuntioides
Schlumbergera truncata
Sclerocactus sileri
Selenicereus murrillii
Stenocereus alamosensis
Strombocactus disciformis
Strophocactus brasiliensis, syn. Pseudoacanthocereus brasiliensis
Tacinga braunii
Turbinicarpus saueri
Turbinicarpus valdezianus
Weberocereus bradei
Weberocereus tonduzii

Aizoaceae

Antimima eendornensis
Conophytum halenbergense
Frithia pulchra
Jensenobotrya lossowiana
Juttadinteria kovisimontana
Lithops francisci
Lithops hermetica
Lithops werneri
Ruschianthus falcatus
Schwantesia constanceae

Fagales
There are 45 species and one subspecies in the order Fagales assessed as vulnerable.

Nothofagaceae

Nothofagus discoidea
Nothofagus glauca
Nothofagus stylosa

Ticodendraceae
Ticodendron incognitum

Fagaceae

Species

Castanopsis concinna
Castanopsis nephelioides
Castanopsis scortechinii
Castanopsis wallichii
Fagus hayatae
Fagus longipetiolata
Lithocarpus burkillii
Lithocarpus curtisii
Lithocarpus erythrocarpus
Lithocarpus hendersonianus
Lithocarpus indutus
Lithocarpus kingii, synonym of Lithocarpus perakensis
Lithocarpus maingayi
Lithocarpus ovalis
Quercus acutifolia
Quercus arkansana, Arkansas oak
Quercus benthamii
Quercus bumelioides
Quercus cedrosensis, Cedros Island oak
Quercus costaricensis
Quercus deliquescens
Quercus devia
Quercus engelmannii, Engelmann oak
Quercus flagellifera
Quercus galeanensis
Quercus germana
Quercus hintoniorum
Quercus macdonaldii, Macdonald oak
Quercus macdougallii
Quercus purulhana
Quercus rapurahuensis
Quercus skinneri
Quercus subspathulata
Quercus tomentella, Island oak
Quercus uxoris
Quercus vicentensis
Quercus xalapensis
Trigonobalanus excelsa

Subspecies
Quercus robur subsp. imeretina

Betulaceae

Corylus colchica, Colchian hazel
Ostryopsis intermedia
Ostryopsis nobilis, Yunnan tiger hazel

Salicales

Species

Chosenia arbutifolia
Populus ilicifolia, Tana river poplar
Salix blinii
Salix floridana, Florida willow
Salix magnifica

Subspecies
Populus mexicana subsp. mexicana

Other dicotyledon species

Corydalis filistipes
Corydalis tarkiensis, Tarkian corydalis
Gunnera aequatoriensis
Illicium kinabaluensis
Illicium ternstroemioides
Morella arborea
Papaver laestadianum
Papaver talyshense, Talyshian poppy
Plantago lacustris

Monocotyledons
There are 619 species, six subspecies, and four varieties of monocotyledon assessed as vulnerable.

Triuridales
Seychellaria thomassetii

Arecales

Species

Aiphanes chiribogensis
Aiphanes duquei
Aiphanes lindeniana
Alloschmidia glabrata
Archontophoenix myolensis, Myola palm
Areca ipot, Ipot palm
Areca parens
Areca whitfardii
Arenga listeri, Lister's palm
Arenga wightii
Asterogyne spicata
Astrocaryum carnosum
Bactris coloniata
Bactris horridispatha
Bactris jamaicana, Prickly pole
Bactris longiseta
Bactris pickelii
Basselinia favieri
Basselinia iterata
Basselinia tomentosa
Basselinia vestita
Beccariophoenix alfredii
Beccariophoenix madagascariensis
Bentinckia condapanna
Borassodendron machadonis
Brahea aculeata
Brahea pimo
Butia eriospatha
Butia purpurascens
Calamus egregius
Ceroxylon echinulatum
Ceroxylon quindiuense
Chamaedorea adscendens
Chamaedorea foveata
Chamaedorea oblongata
Coccothrinax pauciramosa
Colpothrinax wrightii
Copernicia brittonorum
Copernicia gigas
Corypha microclada
Cyphophoenix elegans
Cyphosperma trichospadix
Deckenia nobilis, Millionaire's salad
Dypsis andrianatonga
Dypsis bejofo
Dypsis bernierana
Dypsis betamponensis
Dypsis betsimisarakae
Dypsis bonsai
Dypsis decaryi
Dypsis decipiens, Manambe palm
Dypsis delicatula
Dypsis gautieri
Dypsis hiarakae
Dypsis humbertii
Dypsis jumelleana
Dypsis lanceolata
Dypsis lantzeana
Dypsis lokohoensis
Dypsis louvelii
Dypsis makirae
Dypsis marojejyi
Dypsis minuta
Dypsis montana
Dypsis occidentalis
Dypsis onilahensis
Dypsis oreophila
Dypsis paludosa
Dypsis pembana
Dypsis perrieri
Dypsis pilulifera
Dypsis prestoniana
Dypsis procera
Dypsis pusilla
Dypsis scottiana
Dypsis serpentina
Dypsis thermarum
Dypsis thiryana
Dypsis tsaravoasira
Dypsis viridis
Euterpe luminosa
Gaussia attenuata
Gaussia gomez-pompae
Gaussia maya
Hedyscepe canterburyana, Big mountain palm
Howea belmoreana, Curly palm
Howea forsteriana
Hydriastele vitiensis
Juania australis
Jubaea chilensis
Jubaeopsis caffra, Pondoland palm
Licuala dasyantha
Livistona carinensis, Bankouale palm
Livistona robinsoniana
Livistona woodfordii
Mackeea magnifica
Normanbya normanbyi, Black palm
Oenocarpus circumtextus
Oncosperma platyphyllum
Orania ravaka
Orania trispatha
Pholidocarpus kingianus
Pholidocarpus macrocarpus
Pritchardia lowreyana
Pritchardia waialealeana
Raphia regalis
Ravenea glauca
Ravenea xerophila
Rhopaloblaste augusta
Roystonea lenis
Sabal gretheriae
Sabal pumos
Sabal uresana
Schippia concolor, Mountain pimento
Syagrus glaucescens
Syagrus stratincola
Veitchia simulans
Wettinia aequatorialis
Wettinia longipetala

Varieties
Hemithrinax rivularis var. rivularis
Hemithrinax rivularis var. savannarum

Orchidales
There are 114 species and three subspecies in Orchidales assessed as vulnerable.

Orchidaceae

Species

Acianthera malachantha
Acianthera tokachii
Aeranthes carnosa
Aeranthes schlechteri
Aeranthes tropophila
Aerides leeana
Agrostophyllum laterale
Altensteinia longispicata
Anacamptis boryi, Bory's anacamptis
Anathallis guimaraensii
Ancistrorhynchus laxiflorus
Androcorys oxysepalus
Angraecopsis cryptantha
Angraecopsis parva
Angraecopsis tridens
Angraecum pungens
Angraecum pyriforme
Anoectochilus sandvicensis, Hawaii jewel-orchid
Ansellia africana, Leopard orchid
Bartholina etheliae
Benthamia perularioides
Brachionidium capillare
Brachionidium diaphanum
Bulbophyllum atrosanguineum
Bulbophyllum bifarium
Bulbophyllum gravidum
Bulbophyllum jaapii
Bulbophyllum nigericum
Bulbophyllum rubrum
Bulbophyllum sanderianum
Caladenia dundasiae, Dunda's spider orchid
Calanthe delavayi
Calanthe fargesii
Calanthe henryi
Cheirostylis notialis, Southern fleshy jewel orchid
Corallorhiza bentleyi, Bentley's coralroot
Cynorkis uncata
Cypripedium bardolphianum, Bardolph's cypripedium
Cypripedium candidum, White lady's slipper
Cypripedium cordigerum, Heart-shaped lip cypripedium
Cypripedium debile, Frail cypripedium
Cypripedium fasciculatum, Clustered lady's-slipper
Cypripedium flavum, Yellow cypripedium
Cypripedium henryi, Henry's cypripedium
Cypripedium irapeanum, Irapeao cypripedium
Cypripedium kentuckiense, Kentucky lady's slipper
Cypripedium montanum, Mountain lady's slipper
Cypripedium palangshanense, Palangshan cypripedium
Cypripedium passerinum, Sparrow's-egg lady's-slipper
Cypripedium plectrochilum, Ram's head lady slipper
Dendrobium sanderae
Diaphananthe polydactyla
Dinklageella scandens
Disperis aphylla
Disperis mildbraedii
Epidendrum diothonaeoides
Epigeneium treacherianum
Epipactis nordeniorum
Eulophia faberi, synonym of Eulophia dabia
Gastrodia elata, Tall gastrodia
Genyorchis macrantha
Habenaria delavayi
Habenaria fargesii
Habenaria finetiana
Habenaria fordii
Habenaria kornasiana
Habenaria mairei
Habenaria nigrescens
Habenaria obovata
Habenaria plectromaniaca
Habenaria stylites
Habenaria thomana
Habenaria yuana
Hemipilia flabellata
Hemipilia forrestii
Hemipilia limprichtii
Herminium ophioglossoides
Holothrix socotrana
Isotria medeoloides, Small whorled pogonia
Malaxis muscifera
Malaxis seychellarum
Masdevallia notosibirica
Neobenthamia gracilis
Ophrys argolica, Argolic ophrys
Paphiopedilum hirsutissimum, Shaggy paphiopedilum
Paphiopedilum villosum, Villose paphiopedilum
Phalaenopsis violacea
Phragmipedium humboldtii, Humboldt's phragmipedium
Phragmipedium lindleyanum, Lindley's phragmipedium
Phragmipedium reticulatum, Reticulated phragmipedium
Phragmipedium warszewiczianum
Platanthera chapmanii, Chapman's fringed orchid
Platanthera deflexilabella
Platanthera finetiana
Platanthera likiangensis
Platanthera longiglandula, synonym of Platanthera bakeriana
Platanthera oreophila
Platanthera platantheroides
Platanthera sinica
Platanthera yadonii, Yadon's rein
Platythelys paranaensis
Pleione chunii
Pleione formosana
Pleione pleionoides
Polystachya bicalcarata
Psychilis olivacea
Sobennikoffia poissoniana
Spiranthes parksii, Navasota ladies-tresses
Stelis tabacina
Telipogon alexii
Tsaiorchis neottianthoides
Vanda spathulata

Subspecies

Cynorkis buchwaldiana subsp. braunii
Polystachya albescens subsp. kraenzlinii
Polystachya caespitifica subsp. latilabris

Burmanniaceae
Afrothismia insignis
Thismia melanomitra

Cyclanthales

Asplundia cayapensis
Asplundia cuspidata
Asplundia lilacina
Asplundia meraensis
Asplundia pastazana
Asplundia quinindensis
Asplundia sparrei
Sphaeradenia brachiolata
Sphaeradenia versicolor

Pandanales

Freycinetia auriculata
Freycinetia awaiarensis
Martellidendron hornei, Horne's pandanus
Pandanus aldabraensis
Pandanus balfourii, Balfour's pandanus
Pandanus decastigma
Pandanus decipiens
Pandanus decumbens
Pandanus gabonensis
Pandanus halleorum
Pandanus joskei
Pandanus kajui
Pandanus petersii
Pandanus taveuniensis
Pandanus thomensis

Bromeliales

Aechmea aculeatosepala
Aechmea biflora
Aechmea lugoi
Aechmea patriciae
Aechmea roeseliae
Deuterocohnia chrysantha
Gregbrownia brownii, syn. Mezobromelia brownii
Greigia atrobrunnea
Guzmania aequatorialis
Guzmania alborosea
Guzmania andreettae
Guzmania atrocastanea
Guzmania bergii
Guzmania corniculata
Guzmania dalstroemii
Guzmania fusispica
Guzmania harlingii
Guzmania hirtzii
Guzmania hollinensis
Guzmania inexpectata
Guzmania izkoi
Guzmania kentii
Guzmania madisonii
Guzmania pseudospectabilis
Guzmania puyoensis
Guzmania sieffiana
Guzmania zakii
Hechtia melanocarpa
Navia sandwithii
Pitcairnia andreetae
Pitcairnia carnososepala, syn. Pepinia carnososepala
Pitcairnia devansayana
Pitcairnia elvirae, syn. Pepinia verrucosa
Pitcairnia ferrell-ingramiae
Pitcairnia harlingii, syn. Pepinia harlingii
Pitcairnia harrylutheri, syn. Pepinia fulgens
Pitcairnia hirtzii
Pitcairnia prolifera
Pitcairnia stevensonii
Pitcairnia unilateralis
Pitcairnia violascens
Puya alata
Puya herrerae
Puya obconica
Puya pichinchae
Puya pygmaea
Puya reflexiflora
Puya sodiroana
Racinaea blassii
Racinaea euryelytra
Racinaea hauggiae
Racinaea tandapiana
Ronnbergia wuelfinghoffii, syn. Aechmea wuelfinghoffii
Tillandsia aequatorialis
Tillandsia brenneri
Tillandsia candida
Tillandsia cucullata
Tillandsia emergens
Tillandsia hemkeri
Tillandsia hirtzii
Tillandsia lutheri, syn. Vriesea lutheri
Tillandsia marnieri-lapostollei
Tillandsia ortgiesiana
Tillandsia pretiosa
Tillandsia raackii
Tillandsia rhodosticta
Tillandsia sodiroi
Tillandsia walter-tillii, syn. Vriesea tillii
Vriesea andreettae
Vriesea camptoclada
Vriesea limonensis
Vriesea penduliscapa
Vriesea wuelfinghoffii
Werauhia haltonii
Werauhia paupera

Liliales

Species

Albuca yerburyi, Yellow shum shum lily
Allium exaltatum
Allium pardoi
Allium pyrenaicum
Allium schmitzii
Aloe brachystachys
Aloe bussei
Aloe leachii
Aloe lindenii
Aloe massawana
Aloe pulcherrima
Aloe retrospiciens
Aloe rugosifolia
Aloe somaliensis
Aloe squarrosa
Aloe tororoana
Aloe ukambensis
Aloidendron ramosissimum, Maiden's quiver tree
Androcymbium psammophilum
Asparagus arborescens
Asparagus plocamoides
Asphodeline tenuior, Thin asphodeline
Asphodelus bento-rainhae
Babiana salteri
Bomarea elegans
Bomarea gracilis
Bomarea lanata
Bomarea lutea
Bulbinella eburniflora
Chrysodracon auwahiensis
Chrysodracon halapepe
Colchicum corsicum
Crinum campanulatum
Crocus cyprius
Crocus hartmannianus
Cyanella aquatica
Cyrtanthus flavus
Dioscorea longicuspis
Dioscorea rosei
Dipcadi kuriensis
Dracaena cinnabari, Dragon's blood tree
Dracaena draco, Canary Island dragon tree
Dracaena viridiflora
Eriospermum halenbergense
Eucrosia dodsonii
Eucrosia stricklandii
Fritillaria drenovskii
Fritillaria euboeica
Gagea apulica, Gagée des pouilles
Gagea chrysantha, Golden gagea
Gagea luberonensis, Luberon gagea
Gagea moniliformis, Chaplet gagea
Gagea omalensis, Omalos gagea
Gagea sicula
Galanthus ikariae
Galanthus koenenianus, Koenen's snowdrop
Galanthus peshmenii
Galanthus reginae-olgae
Geissorhiza lithicola
Gladiolus hajastanicus, Armenian sword-lily
Gladiolus pole-evansii
Hypoxidia rhizophylla
Iris camillae, Kamilla's iris
Iris haynei, Gilboa iris
Iris nigricans, Black iris
Iris vartanii, Vartanii iris
Kniphofia goetzei
Lilium rhodopeum
Moraea callista
Moraea stagnalis
Ornithogalum hyrcanum, Hyrkanyan starflowers
Pamianthe parviflora
Phaedranassa cinerea
Phaedranassa schizantha
Romulea multisulcata
Trachyandra erythrorrhiza
Trachyandra peculiaris

Subspecies

Aloe gilbertii subsp. megalacanthoides
Fritillaria obliqua subsp. tuntasia
Iris spuria subsp. notha, Mimic iris

Arales

Araceae

Amorphophallus curvistylis
Amorphophallus kienluongensis
Amorphophallus preussii
Amorphophallus verticillatus
Anthurium albovirescens
Anthurium auritum
Anthurium balslevii
Anthurium bullosum
Anthurium cabuyalense
Anthurium caloveboranum
Anthurium ceratiinum
Anthurium curtispadix
Anthurium dolichophyllum
Anthurium ecuadorense
Anthurium esmeraldense
Anthurium gualeanum
Anthurium hebetatilaminum
Anthurium jaramilloi
Anthurium jimenae
Anthurium leonianum
Anthurium magnifolium
Anthurium manabianum
Anthurium miniatum
Anthurium nemorale
Anthurium oxyphyllum
Anthurium pedunculare
Anthurium polystictum
Anthurium punctatum
Anthurium rimbachii
Anthurium silanchense
Anthurium subcoerulescens
Anthurium superbum
Anthurium tenaense
Arisaema maxwellii
Arum purpureospathum
Chlorospatha castula
Chlorospatha ilensis
Culcasia sanagensis
Gonatopus petiolulatus
Philodendron hooveri
Philodendron musifolium
Philodendron riparium
Protarum sechellarum
Rhaphidophora pusilla
Stenospermation gracile
Stenospermation hilligii
Stylochaeton crassispathus
Stylochaeton euryphyllus
Stylochaeton milneanus
Stylochaeton tortispathus
Syngonium harlingianum
Syngonium sparreorum
Typhonium johnsonianum

Zingiberales
There are 42 species in the order Zingiberales assessed as vulnerable.

Marantaceae

Calathea congesta
Calathea curaraya
Calathea gandersii
Calathea lanicaulis
Calathea latrinotecta
Calathea multicinta
Calathea pluriplicata
Stromanthe ramosissima
Thalia pavonii

Heliconiaceae

Heliconia berryi
Heliconia brenneri
Heliconia excelsa
Heliconia fredberryana
Heliconia gaiboriana
Heliconia litana
Heliconia lutheri
Heliconia markiana
Heliconia obscura
Heliconia paludigena
Heliconia pardoi
Heliconia peckenpaughii
Heliconia peteriana
Heliconia riopalenquensis
Heliconia virginalis

Costaceae
Costus osae

Zingiberaceae

Amomum calcaratum
Amomum lambirense
Amomum odontocarpum
Amomum petaloideum
Amomum vespertilio
Curcuma candida
Curcuma pseudomontana, Hill turmeric
Curcuma rhabdota, Candy cane ginger
Geostachys smitinandii
Globba flagellaris
Globba praecox
Haniffia albiflora
Pleuranthodium papilionaceum
Renealmia oligotricha
Siamanthus siliquosus
Siliquamomum tonkinense
Zingiber collinsii

Eriocaulales

Eriocaulon aethiopicum
Eriocaulon asteroides
Eriocaulon bamendae
Eriocaulon karnatakense
Eriocaulon kolhapurense
Eriocaulon konkanense
Eriocaulon maharashtrense
Eriocaulon parvulum
Eriocaulon pectinatum
Eriocaulon tuberiferum
Syngonanthus yacuambensis

Commelinales

Aneilema silvaticum
Murdannia lanceolata
Palisota preussiana
Xyris boliviana
Xyris kibaraensis

Cyperales
There are 78 species and two varieties in Cyperales assessed as vulnerable.

Gramineae

Achnatherum roshevitzii, Roshevich's achnatherum
Alloeochaete namuliensis
Alloeochaete ulugurensis
Aristida guayllabambensis
Calamagrostis aurea
Calamagrostis carchiensis
Calamagrostis expansa
Calamagrostis fulgida
Calamagrostis hirta
Calamagrostis llanganatensis
Calamagrostis steyermarkii
Calamagrostis teretifolia
Chusquea falcata
Chusquea loxensis
Chusquea maclurei
Colpodium chionogeiton
Colpodium drakensbergense
Colpodium hedbergii
Cortaderia turbaria, Chatham Island toe
Danthonia holm-nielsenii
Deschampsia angusta
Eragrostis ambleia
Eragrostis perbella
Eragrostis usambarensis
Eremocaulon setosum
Festuca brigantina
Festuca caldasii
Festuca parciflora
Festuca yemenensis
Glyphochloa santapaui
Helictochloa hackelii
Hubbardia heptaneuron
Hylebates chlorochloe
Hypseochloa cameroonensis
Isachne bicolor
Neurolepis asymmetrica
Neurolepis laegaardii
Neurolepis villosa
Opizia bracteata
Panicum joshuae, Rock millet
Panicum pinifolium
Panicum vollesenii
Paspalum rugulosum
Phalaris maderensis
Puccinellia pungens
Rhytachne furtiva
Rhytachne glabra
Stipa bavarica
Stipa karjaginii, Karjagin's feather-grass
Suddia sagittifolia

Cyperaceae

Species

Bolboschoenus grandispicus
Bulbostylis pseudoperennis
Carex dolichogyne
Carex korkischkoae
Carex monostachya
Carex phragmitoides
Carex runssoroensis
Carex subinflata
Carpha eminii
Cyathocoma bachmannii
Cyperus commixtus
Cyperus cyprius
Cyperus densibulbosus
Cyperus lateriticus
Cyperus micropelophilus
Cyperus rheophytorum
Cyperus semifertilis, Missionary nutgrass
Fuirena felicis
Fuirena swamyi
Hypolytrum mauritianum
Lagenocarpus compactus
Machaerina lamii
Mapania ferruginea
Mapania seychellaria
Nemum bulbostyloides
Uncinia ecuadorensis
Uncinia subsacculata
Uncinia tenuifolia

Varieties
Bulbostylis densa var. cameroonensis
Carex bequaertii var. maxima

Alismatales

Alisma wahlenbergii
Damasonium alisma
Damasonium polyspermum
Echinodorus eglandulosus
Limnophyton fluitans

Najadales

Aponogeton angustifolius
Aponogeton azureus
Aponogeton bruggenii
Phyllospadix iwatensis
Posidonia sinuosa
Potamogeton ogdenii
Zostera caespitosa
Zostera capensis

Juncales

Juncus caesariensis
Juncus sorrentinii
Luzula mannii

Hydrocharitales

Halophila baillonii, Clover grass
Halophila beccarii, Ocean turf grass
Halophila hawaiiana
Lagarosiphon steudneri

See also 
 Lists of IUCN Red List vulnerable species
 List of least concern plants
 List of near threatened plants
 List of endangered plants
 List of critically endangered plants
 List of recently extinct plants
 List of data deficient plants

Notes

References 

Plants
Vulnerable plants